= Subramaniya Swamy Temple, Thiruparankundram =

Murugan Temple in Madurai district, Tamil Nadu, India

Subramaniya Swamy Temple
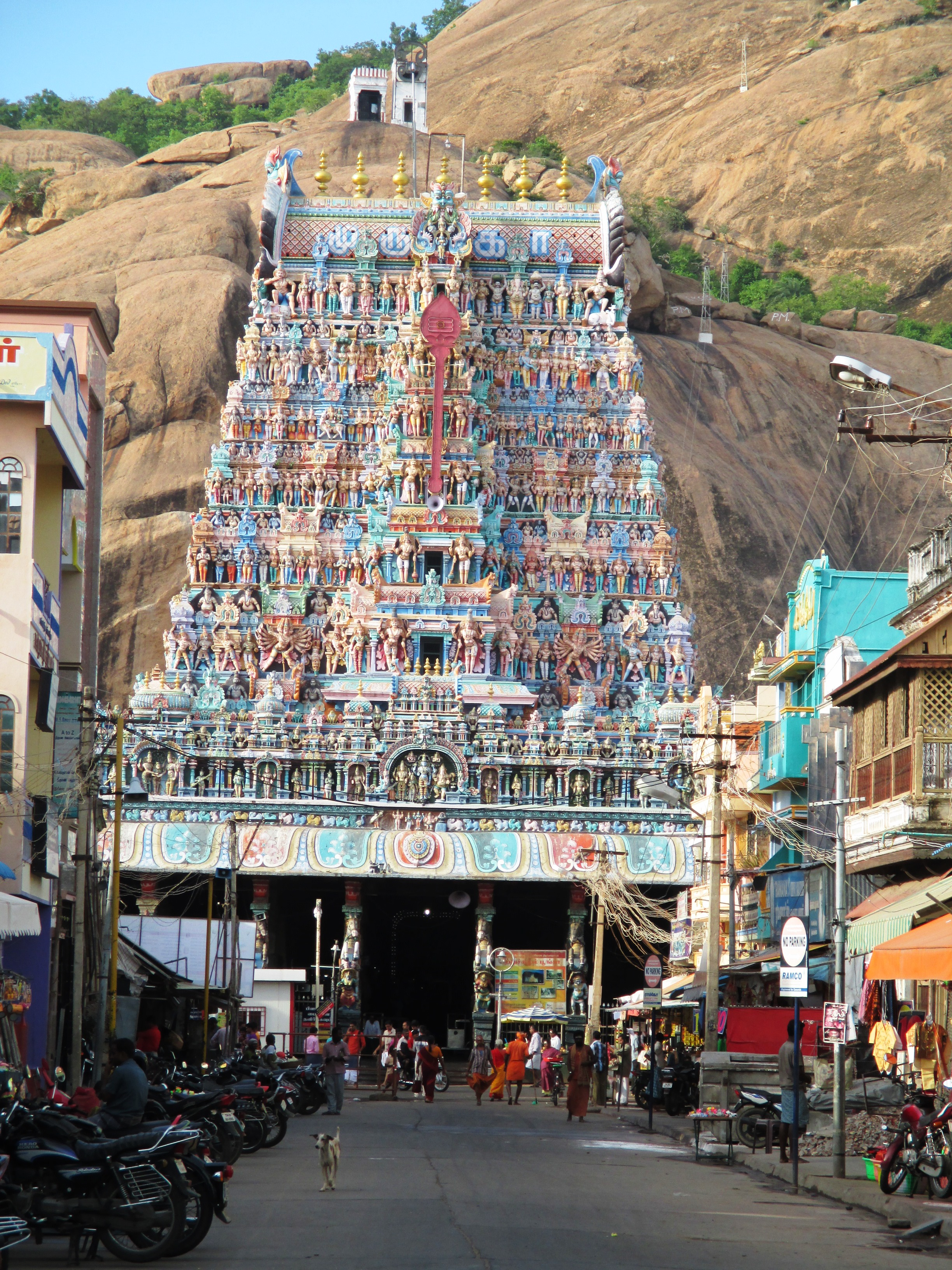
- View of the main gopuram

- Location in Tamil Nadu

Religion
- Affiliation: Hinduism
- District: Madurai
- Deity: Murugan and Deivanai
- Festivals: Vaikasi Visakam; Sura Samhaaram; Kanda Shasti; Thaipusam
- Governing body: Hindu Religious and Charitable Endowments Department, Government of Tamil Nadu

Location
- Location: Thiruparankundram
- State: Tamil Nadu
- Country: India
- Coordinates: 9.8798°N 78.0711°E

Architecture
- Type: Tamil architecture
- Creator: Pandyas
- Established: 6th century

Website
- hrce.tn.gov.in

Subramaniya Swamy Temple is a Hindu temple dedicated to the Hindu god Murugan, located in Thiruparankundram, a suburb of Madurai in Tamil Nadu, India. It is one of the Six Abodes of Murugan (Arupadai Veedu), a set of foremost and sacred Hindu temples, dedicated to Murugan. The temple follows rock-cut architecture and is built into a hillock. The original temple was built by the Pandyas during the 6th century CE. The temple is under the purview of the Hindu Religious and Charitable Endowments Department of the Government of Tamil Nadu.

According to Hindu mythology, Murugan killed the asura Surapadman at Tiruchendur and later married Deivanai, the daughter of Indra, at Thiruparankundram. Murugan worshipped his father Shiva here as Parangirinathar. In the main shrine, apart from Murugan, various Hindu deities including Shiva, Vishnu, Vinayaka, and Durga are housed. The temple follows Shaiva tradition of worship, with six daily rituals. The Kantha Sashti festival, celebrated during the Tamil month of Aipasi, is the most prominent among the festivals celebrated here.

== Mythology ==
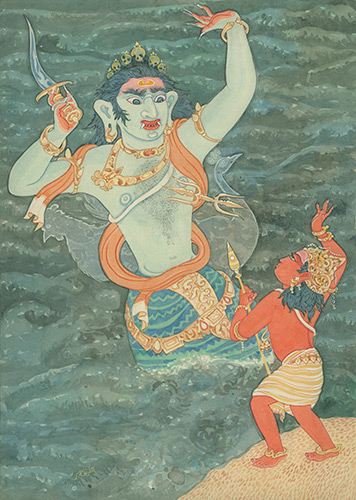
A painting depicting Murugan facing off Surapadman

According to the seventeenth-century CE text Kanda Puranam (the Tamil rendition of the older Skanda Purana), the asura brothers Surapadman, Simhamukhan and Tarakasuran performed tapas to Shiva, who granted them with various weapons and a wish wherein they could only be killed by the son of Shiva, which offered them near-immortality. They subsequently oppressed other celestial beings including the devas, and started a reign of tyranny in the three worlds. When the devas pleaded to Shiva for his assistance, Murugan was born, to take on the asuras. Shiva granted him celestial weapons and the divine spear vel, an embodiment of the power of Shakti (Parvati).

Texts Kanda Puranam and Kumarasambhavam recount a war fought by Murugan against the asuras. As Murugan was born to save the devas from the tyranny of the asuras, he was appointed as the commander of the devas and engaged in conflict with the asuras. Murugan killed Tarakasura and Simhamukha and faced off with Surapadma in the final battle in Tiruchendur. Surapadma took a large form with multiple heads, arms and legs trying to intimidate Murugan. When Murugan threw his vel, Surapadma escaped to the sea and took the form of a large mango tree, which spread across the three worlds. Murugan used his vel to split the tree in half, with each half transforming into a peacock and a rooster, respectively. After Surapadma was killed, Murugan took the peacock as his vahana and the rooster as his pennant.

In gratitude, Indra married his daughter Deivanai to Murugan at Thiruparamkundram. Surasamharam marks the victory of Murugan over Surapadman, marks the end of the Shashthi Vrata, and is celebrated as Kanda Sashti festival in all the Murugan temples. Murugan worshipped Shiva at Thiruparankundram as Parangirinathar.

== History ==
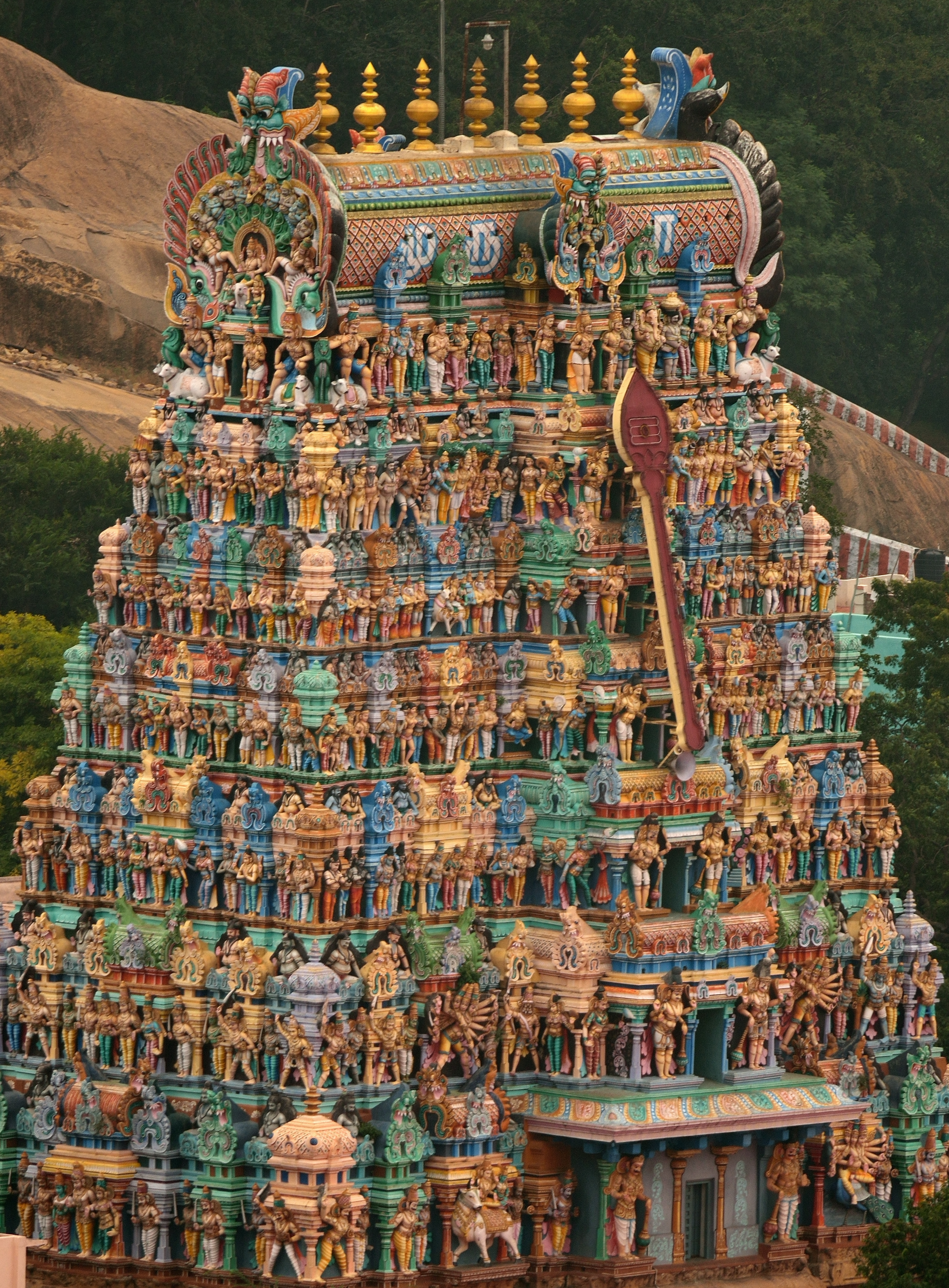
Gopuram of the temple

The Sangam literature of Tirumurukāṟṟuppaṭai, which is one of the major texts of Kaumaram, mentions six shrines (Arupadaiveedu) dedicated to Murugan, with the first being Thiruparankundram.

At the top of the hillock, where the temple is located, two natural caverns consisting of rock beds bearing Tamil-Brahmi are found. These inscriptions have been dated back to the 1st century BCE, and is possibly related to Jainism. The Murugan temple that before the 6th century CE, was converted into a Jain shrine by Jain monks under the aegis of Pandya king Koon Pandiyan. The temple was later converted back into a Hindu temple under the tutelage of Gajapathy, the minister of a later Pandya King, during the latter part of the 8th century CE. The temple received several additions during the regime of Madurai Nayaks, who commissioned the pillared halls in the temple.

Uchinathar, the Shiva icon of the temple, is described in the 7th-century by Shaiva saint Sambandar in Tevaram, compiled as the first Tirumurai. It is classified as one of the Paadal Petra Sthalams, a set of 276 Shiva temples that find mention in the Shaiva canon. The temple is counted as the third in the series of the temples on bank of Vaigai River. Sambandar met the chiefs of the three Tamil kingdoms, the Cheras, the Cholas and the Pandyas in this temple and blessed them. Sundarar, Sambandar, and Nakkirar composed poems at the temple. Tiruppugazh from the 14th century CE describes the shrine.

A rock-cut cave temple dedicated to Shiva exists nearby at the foot of the hill, dated to 7th or 8th century CE. Kasi Viswanathar temple, dedicated to Shiva, is located at the top of the hill. Macchamuni Siddhar is said to have attained samadhi here. The temple complex is maintained and administered by the Hindu Religious and Charitable Endowments Department of the Government of Tamil Nadu.

== Architecture ==
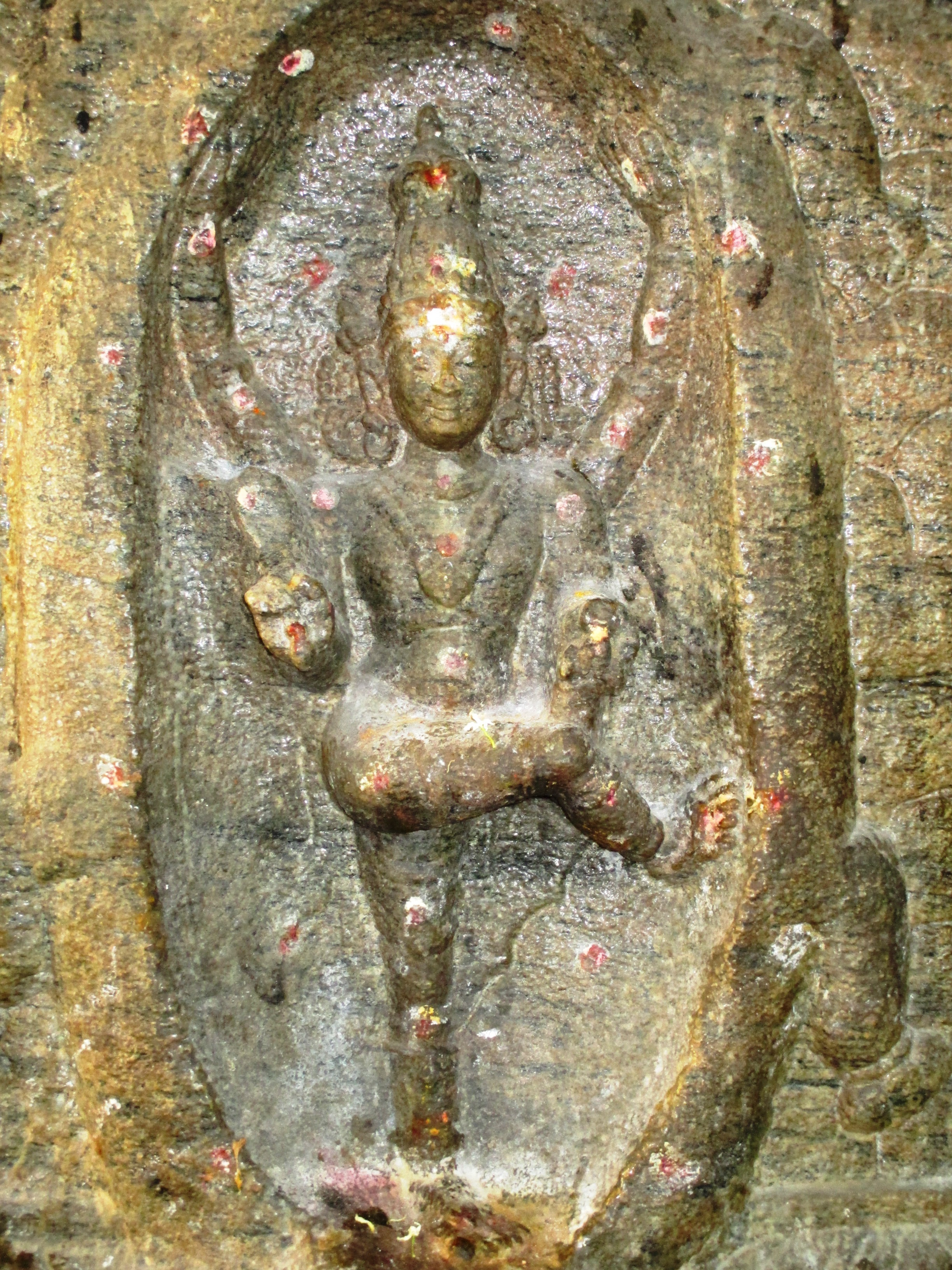
Gajasurasamhara, form of Shiva

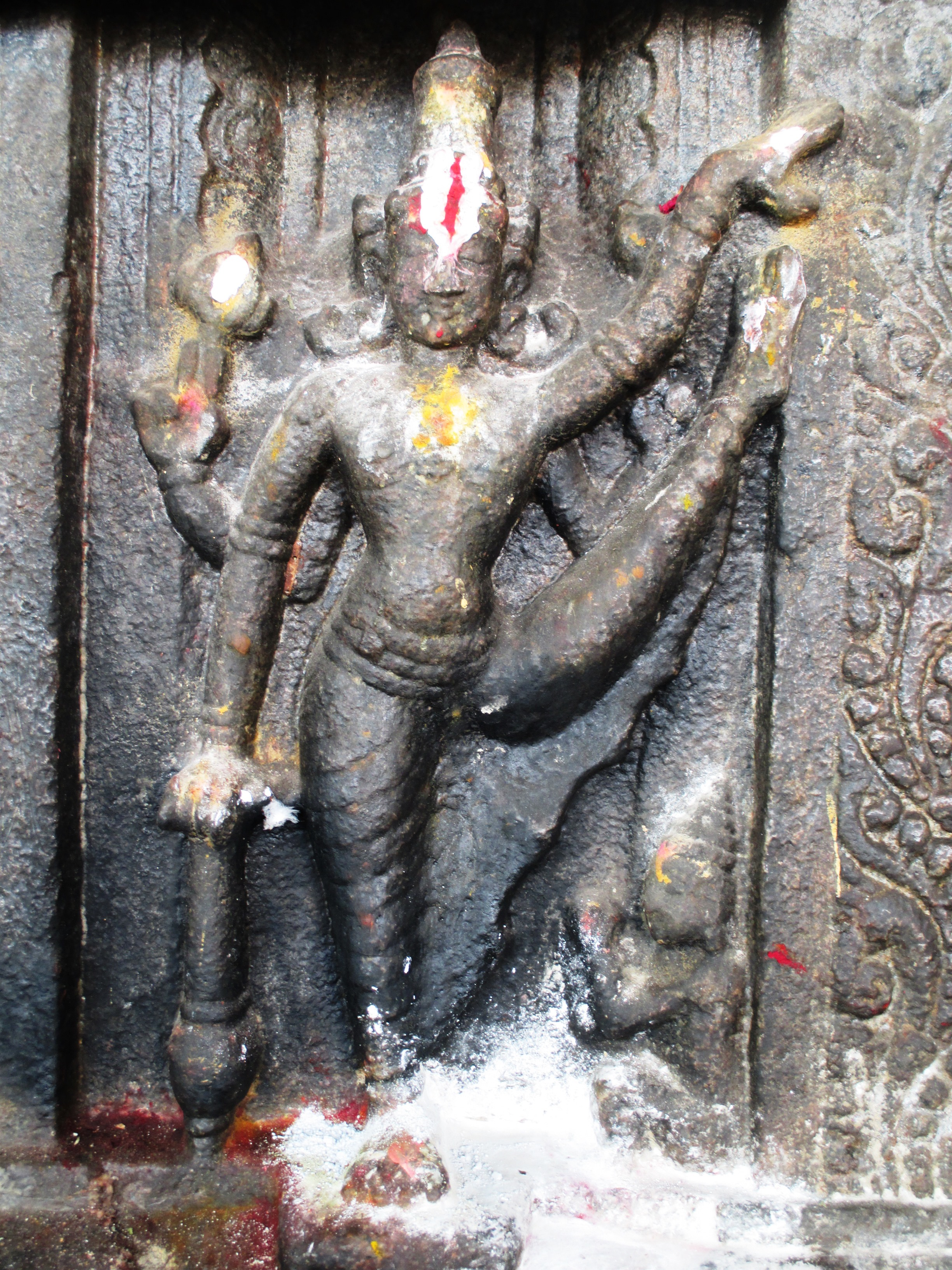
Vishnu as Ulagalantha Perumal

The temple is located 8 km (5.0 mi) from Madurai, on a hillock. The temple is constructed with rock-cut architecture, dating back to the 6th century CE. The life sized sculptures in the mandapam were added during the Nayaka period during the 16th century. Aasthaana Mandapam with several carved pillars lead one to the towering 150 ft (46 m) high seven-tiered rajagopuram at the entrance. The granite hill behind the temple is 1,050 ft (320 m) high, with the Kasi Viswanatha shrine at the top. The image of Vinayaka in the temple is depicted as holding sugarcane and fruits.

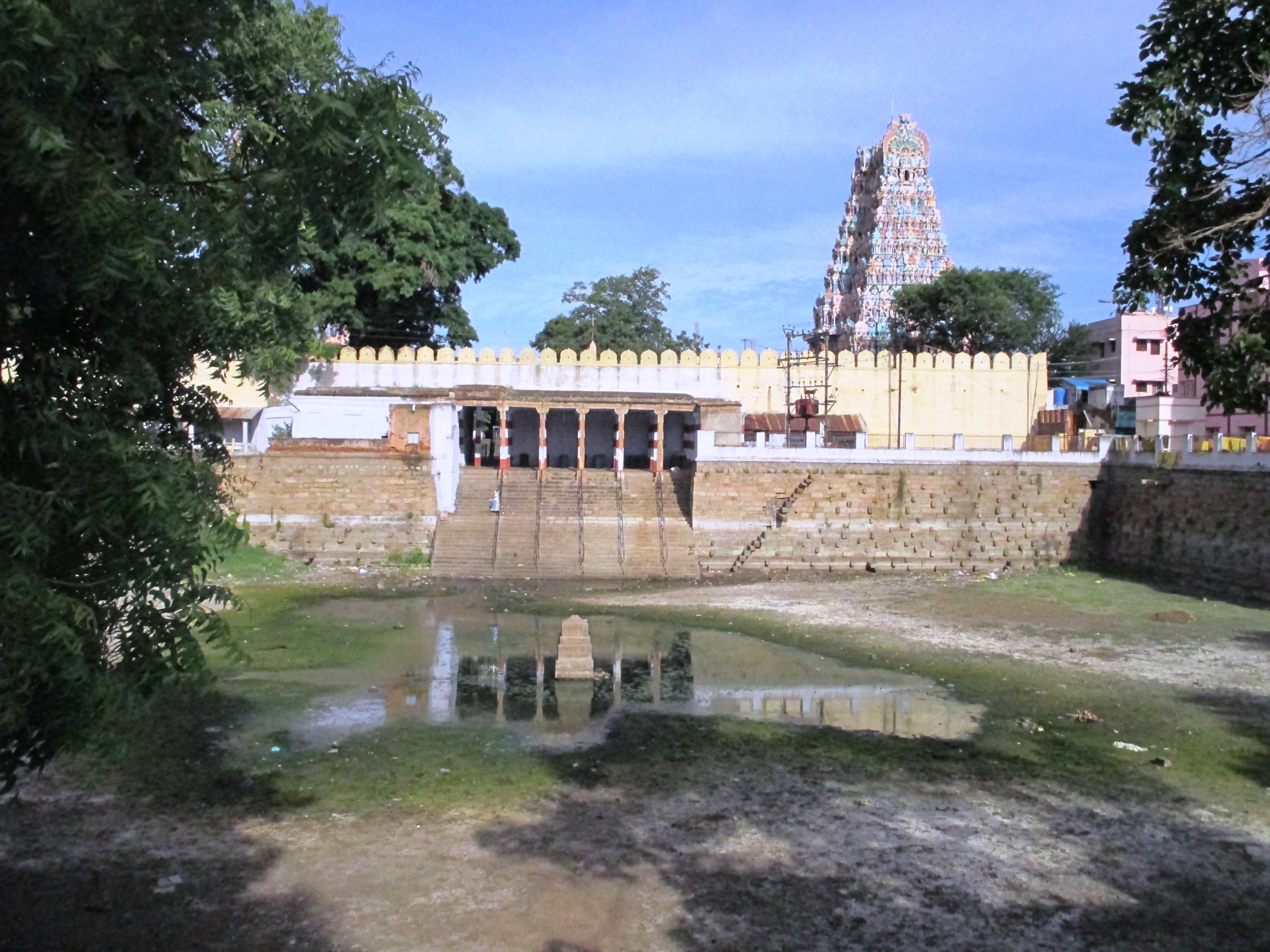
Saravana Poigai (divine pond)

The Kambathadi mandapam, Ardha mandapam, and Maha mandapam, are the three halls leading to the sanctum, and are situated at varying elevations. The main shrine is an early rock-cut temple that has various cells that house the sanctums of Murugan, Durga, Vinayaka, Shiva and Vishnu. All the statues are carved on the walls of the rock. Shiva is worshipped as Parangirinathar with his consort Parvati as Aavudai Nayaki. Panels depicting Shiva's dance of bliss are seen outside the sanctum. The rock cut image of Murgan in the inner sanctum is made from a single stone.

A feature of this temple is that the Shiva and Vishnu face each other in the main shrine. Outside the temple, there is a temple tank, where the fishes are fed with salt and rice flakes by the devotees. There is a Vedic school on the banks of the temple pond. In front of the Dwajasthambam (flag staff), there are carved statues of Nandi (bull), peacock, and mouse, the vahanas (vehicles) of Shiva, Murugan and Vinayaka respectively. There is a flight of six steps called the "Shadashara Padigal", before Ardha Mandapam. The rock carvings of Mahisshasura Mardini (Durga), Karpaga Vinayagar (Ganesha), Andarabaranar and Uggirar are seen in the hall. There are five water bodies, namely, Saravana Poigai, Lakshmi Theertham, Saniyasi Kinaru (well), Kasi Sunai, and Sathiya Koopam.

== Religious importance and festivals ==
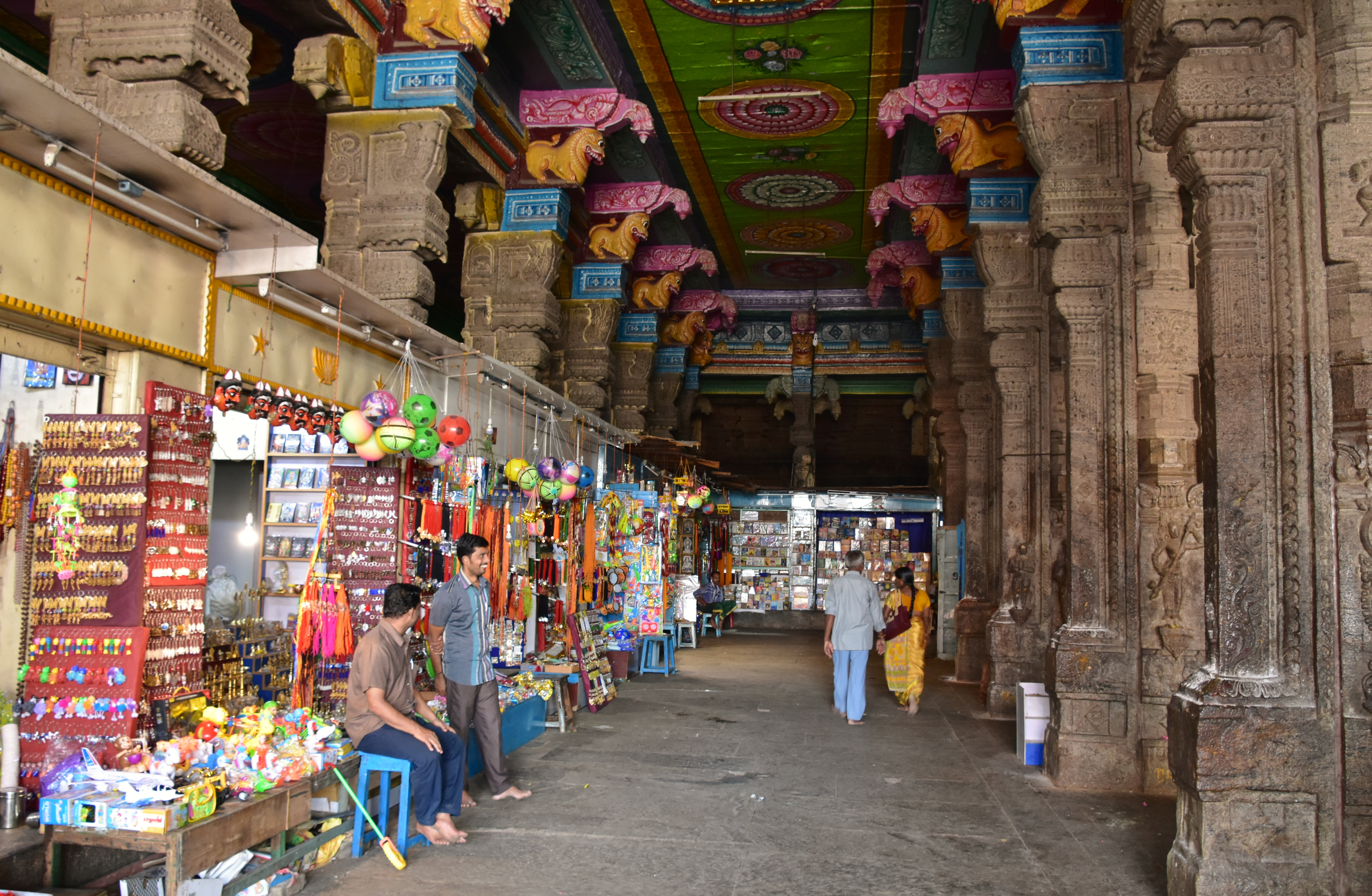
View of the temple entrance

The temple priests perform pujas three times a day– Kalasanthi at 8:00 am, Uchikalam at 12:00 pm and Sayarakshai at 6:00 pm. Each ritual comprises four steps: abhisheka (sacred bath), alangaram (decoration), naivethanam (food offering) and deepa aradanai (waving of lamps) for Uchinathar (Shiva) and Uchinayagi (Parvati). There are weekly rituals like somavaram (Monday) and sukravaram (Friday), fortnightly rituals like pradosham, and monthly festivals like amavasai (new moon day), kiruthigai, pournami (full moon day) and sathurthi.

Skanda Shashti festival celebrated during the Tamil month of Aipasi is the most prominent festival of the temple. Murugan killing Surapadman is enacted during the last of the six days and the festive image of Murugan is taken in different mounts around the streets of the temple during the festival. Brahmotsavam is celebrated in the month Panguni, with Vishnu (Pavalakanivai Perumal), and Murugan taken in procession to Madurai to celebrate Minakshi's wedding (Chittirai festival). Karthigai Deepam festival is also celebrated during the Tamil month of Karthigai by lighting a lamp on top of the hill. Vaikasi Visakam, commemorating the birth of Murugan, and the float festival in Thai are the other festivals celebrated in the temple. Since the image of Vishnu is in the temple, Vaikunta Ekadashi is also celebrated by Vaishnavites.
