= Pachaimalai Subramanya Swamy Temple =

Temple in Tamil Nadu, India

- Main gopuram of the temple

- Location in Tamil Nadu

Religion
- Affiliation: Hinduism
- District: Erode
- Deity: Murugan
- Festivals: Thai Poosam; Panguni Uthiram; Kanda Sashti; Vaikasi Visakam

Location
- Location: Pachaimalai, Gobichettipalayam
- State: Tamil Nadu
- Country: India
- Coordinates: 11°26′56″N 77°26′44″E

Architecture
- Type: Dravidian architecture

Website
- www.pachaimalaimurugan.tnhrce.in

The Pachaimalai Subramanya Swamy Temple, also known as the Pachaimalai Balamurugan Temple, is a Hindu temple dedicated to Murugan, located near Gobichettipalayam in Tamil Nadu. The temple is constructed in the Dravidian style of architecture, and is located on top of a small hillock. The current structure was built in 1956, and was expanded in 1980.

== Mythology and history ==
According to temple legend, while returning from the Pothigai hills, sage Durvasa prayed to Shiva and brought rains due to his penance. Murugan appeared along with Maragathavalli, and urged Durvasa to go to the Pachaimalai hill (also known as Maragatha malai). Durvasa installed a chakra on the hillock, and performed puja. Murugan appeared in the form of a serpent, and Durvasa wished that Murugan should make the hillock as his home, and grant darshan to the people.

The hill finds mention in the Thirukutrala kuravanji composed by Thirigudarasapa Kavirayar in the 17th century CE. As per temple sources, a devotee witnessed a divine spark in 1954 urging the temple's construction, and the structure was built in 1956, and expanded later. The temple was renovated and expanded in 1980. The temple underwent further renovations in 2024, and kumbhabhishekham of the temple was performed on 24 February 2024.

== Design and architecture ==
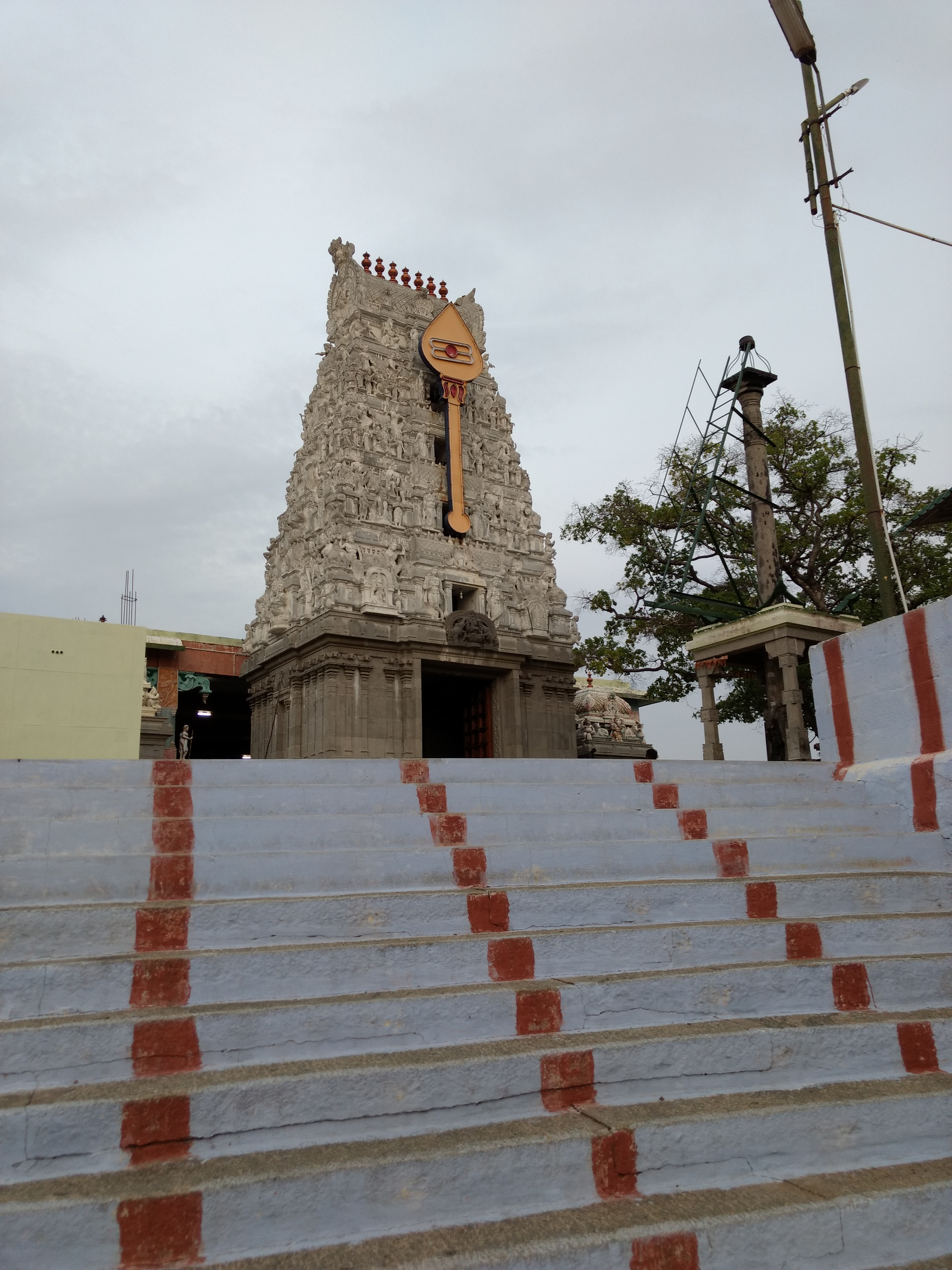
Stairs leading up to the main gopuram

The temple is built in the Dravidian style of architecture and has a five-story gopuram. There are 181 steps that lead up to the temple atop the hill. There is a water spring located at an altitude of 100 ft (30 m). There is a 40 ft (12 m) high statue of Murugan, located on the premises of the temple, atop the hill. A kadamba tree serves as the 'sthala vriksham' (temple tree). An oil lamp burns throughout the day in the main mandapam. The peacock vahana (mount) of Murugan, and the flag staff are located in front of the sanctum.

The main deity is Bala Dhandayuthapani, the younger form of Murugan. Murugan is seen holding a staff (dhanda) in his right hand, while keeping his left hand on the hip. He is also seen wielding the vel, a divine spear, and his rooster insignia. The idol is similar to the one seen in Palani Dhandayuthapani temple, and faces west, in the direction as it was purported to have been installed by Durvasa. In the mandapam around the garbagriha, there is a shrine dedicated to Kalayana Subramaniar, a six-faced Murugan flanked by his consorts Deivanai and Valli. In the premises of the temple, there are shrines dedicated to various other Hindu gods and goddesses, including Vidya Ganapathy, Maragatheeswarar and his consort Maragathavalli, Maragatha Venkatesa Perumal with his consorts Sridevi and Bhoodevi, Dakshinamurti, Bhairava, Shani, and the Navagraha. There is also a shrine to saint Arunagirinathar.

== Practices ==
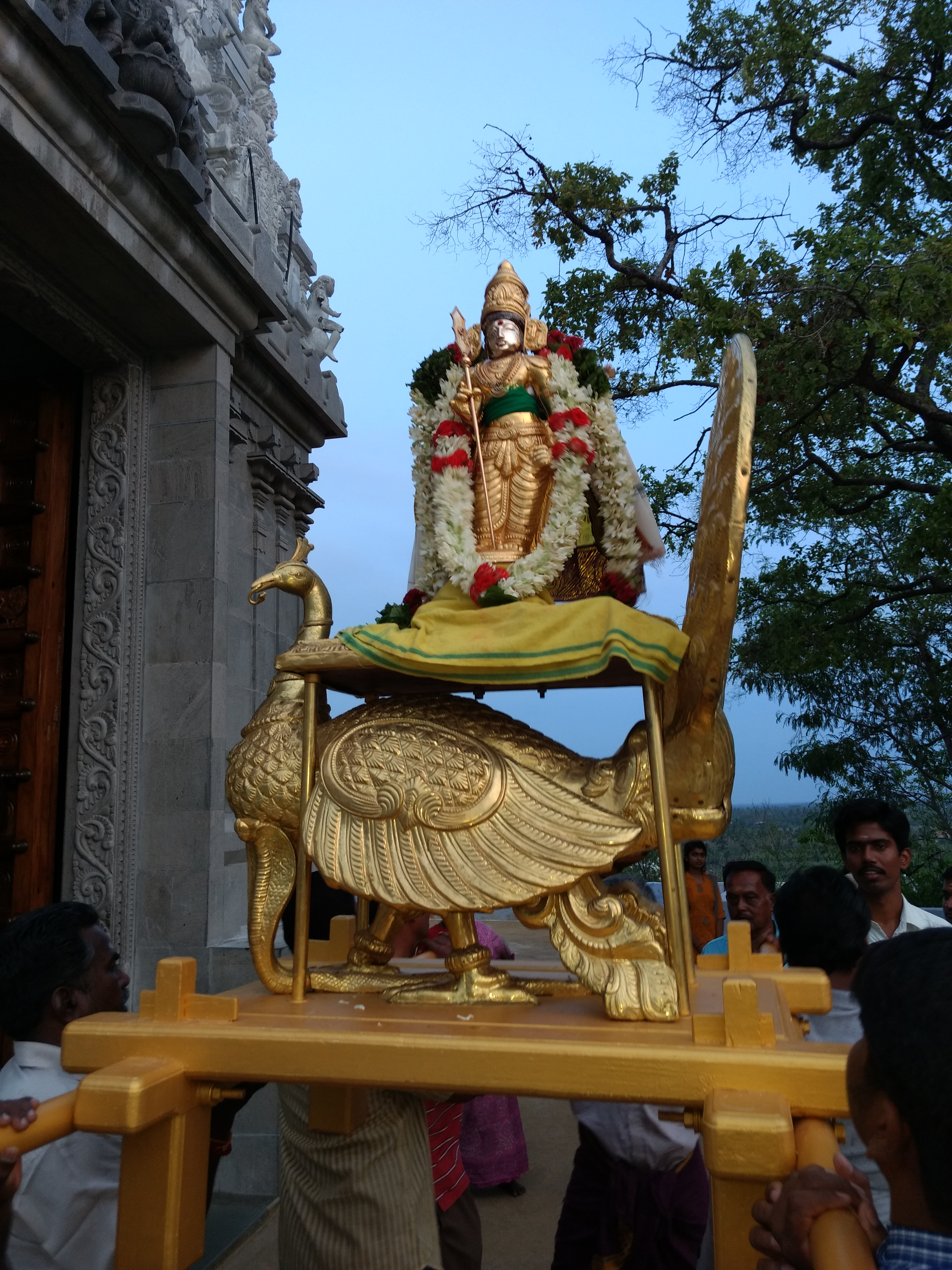
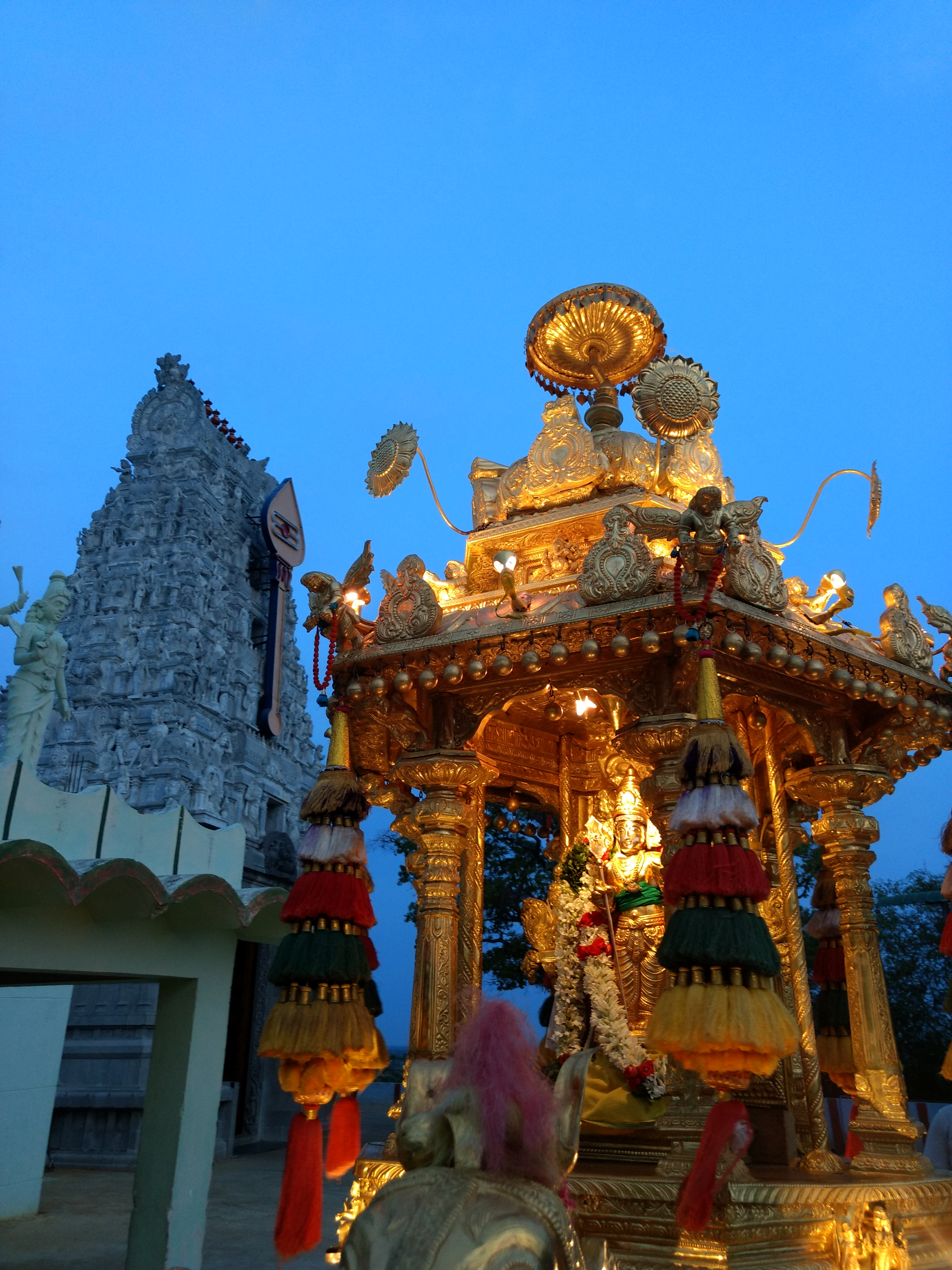
Murugan on golden peacock and golden chariot

There are seven pujas scheduled daily at the temple. During the first puja in the morning, the urchava murti of Murugan, mounted on a golden peacock, is carried out on a procession. There is a golden chariot procession that is held daily. Murugan is generally clothed in white during the procession, and verses from Tirumurukāṟṟuppaṭai are recited. After the puja, milk and millet flour is given as prasad. Special pujas are performed on Tuesdays, tithis of Amavasya, Purnima, Chaturthi, Shasti, Ashtami, and Pradosha, and the nakshatra of Krittika.

During the peak summer season, the Murugan idol is bathed in 108 liters of milk to cool the deity. People awaiting marriage light lamps for seven consecutive Tuesdays to help them with finding a suitable partner. Women wanting children also observe seven days of Shashthi Vrata and eat curd prasad. Special pujas and abhishekam are performed on the Krittika nakshatra days in the Tamil months of Aadi and Thai.

== Festivals ==
The annual seven day Brahmotsavam festival is celebrated during the Tamil month of Panguni (March–April), culminating on the day of Panguni Uthiram. During the festival, special pujas are performed and the idol of Murugan is taken on a procession daily. During the final three days of festivities, Murugan is clothed in red (representing Shiva) on the first day, in white (representing Brahma) on the second day, and green (representing Vishnu) on the Panguni Uthiram day. Vaikasi Visakam is celebrated in the month of Vaikasi (May–June) and commemorates the birth of Murugan. The annual Lacharchanai (hundred thousand chants) and Shatru Samhara Homam is conducted during the festival.

The Thirukalyana utsavam is conducted in the month of Aipasi (October–November), during which Murugan is ritually married to his consorts, Deivanai and Valli. During the final day of Skanda Shashthi, Soorasamharam ritual, which signifies Murugan's vanquishing of the demon Surapadman, is celebrated. On the day, special puja, and archana is performed to Murugan, and the vel spear is granted to him in a symbolic gesture. Other festivals celebrated in the temple include Thaipusam, and Karthigai Deepam. During Thaipusam, special abhisekha is performed, and the Murugan is decorated with flowers. A large lamp is usually lit on the occasion of Karthigai Deepam after pujas are performed.

During the festivals, people often carry kavadi and milk pots, and other offerings to the deity. Annadhanam (food) is also given daily, and on special occasions.

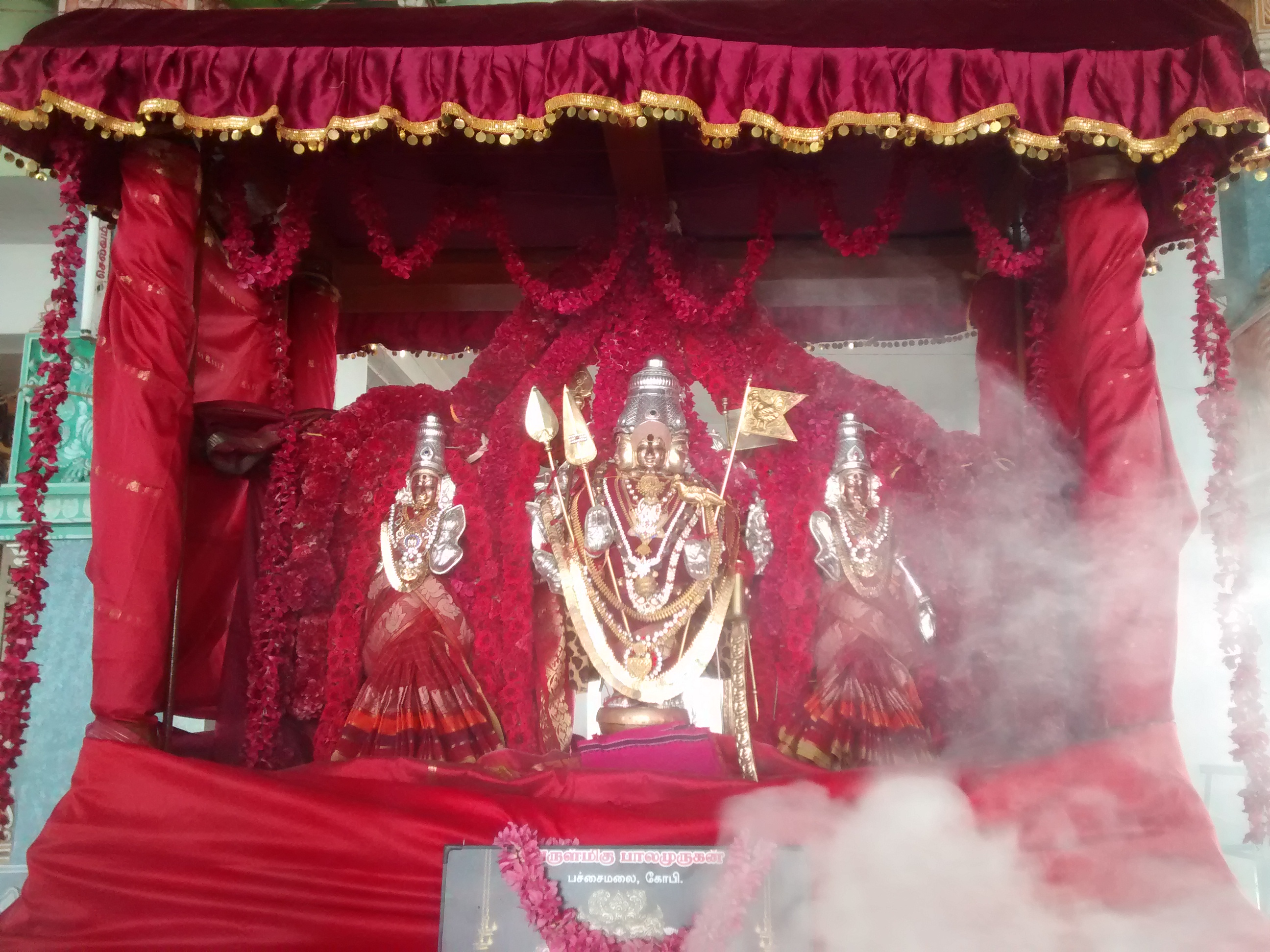
In red attire

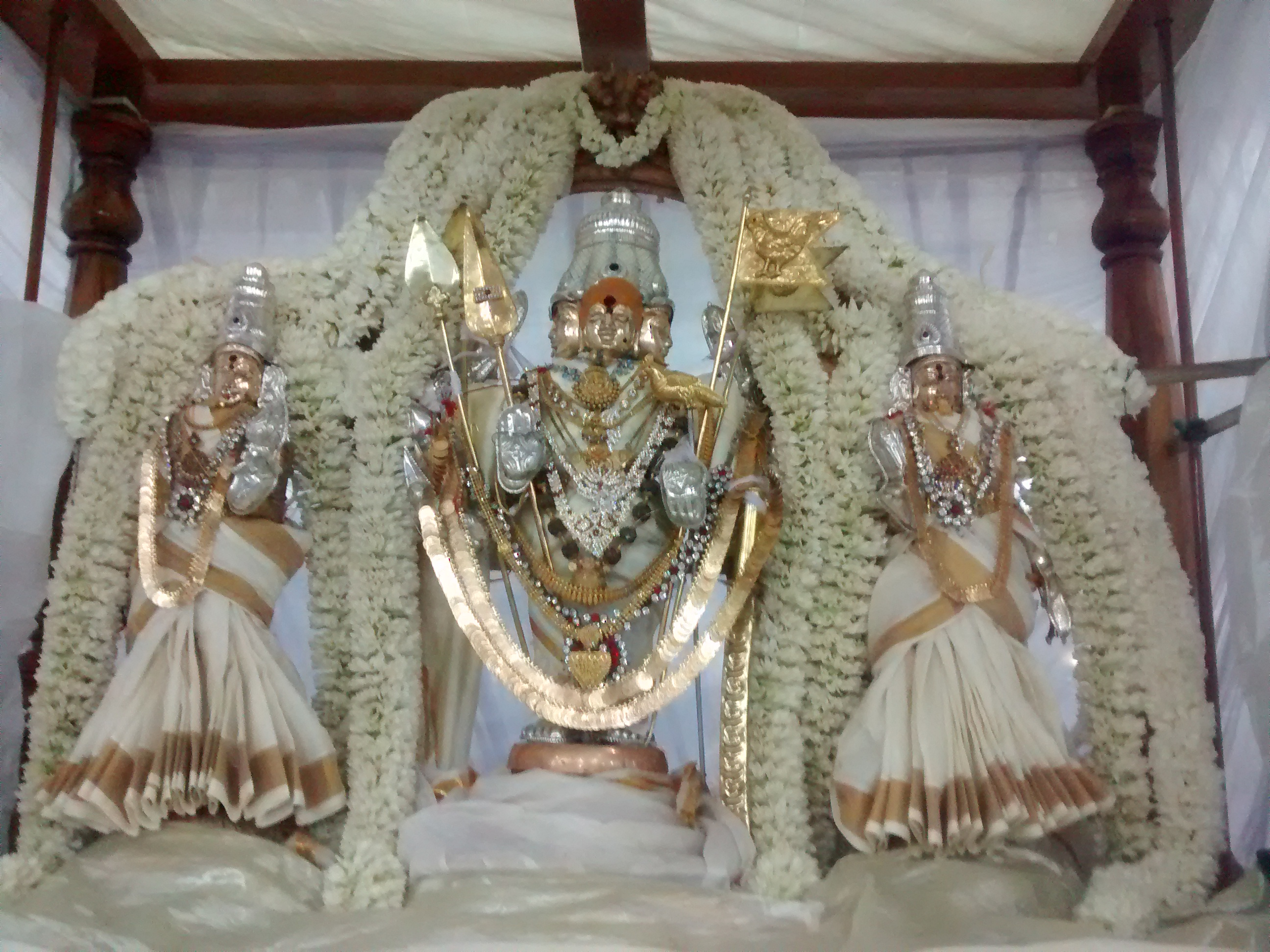
In white attire

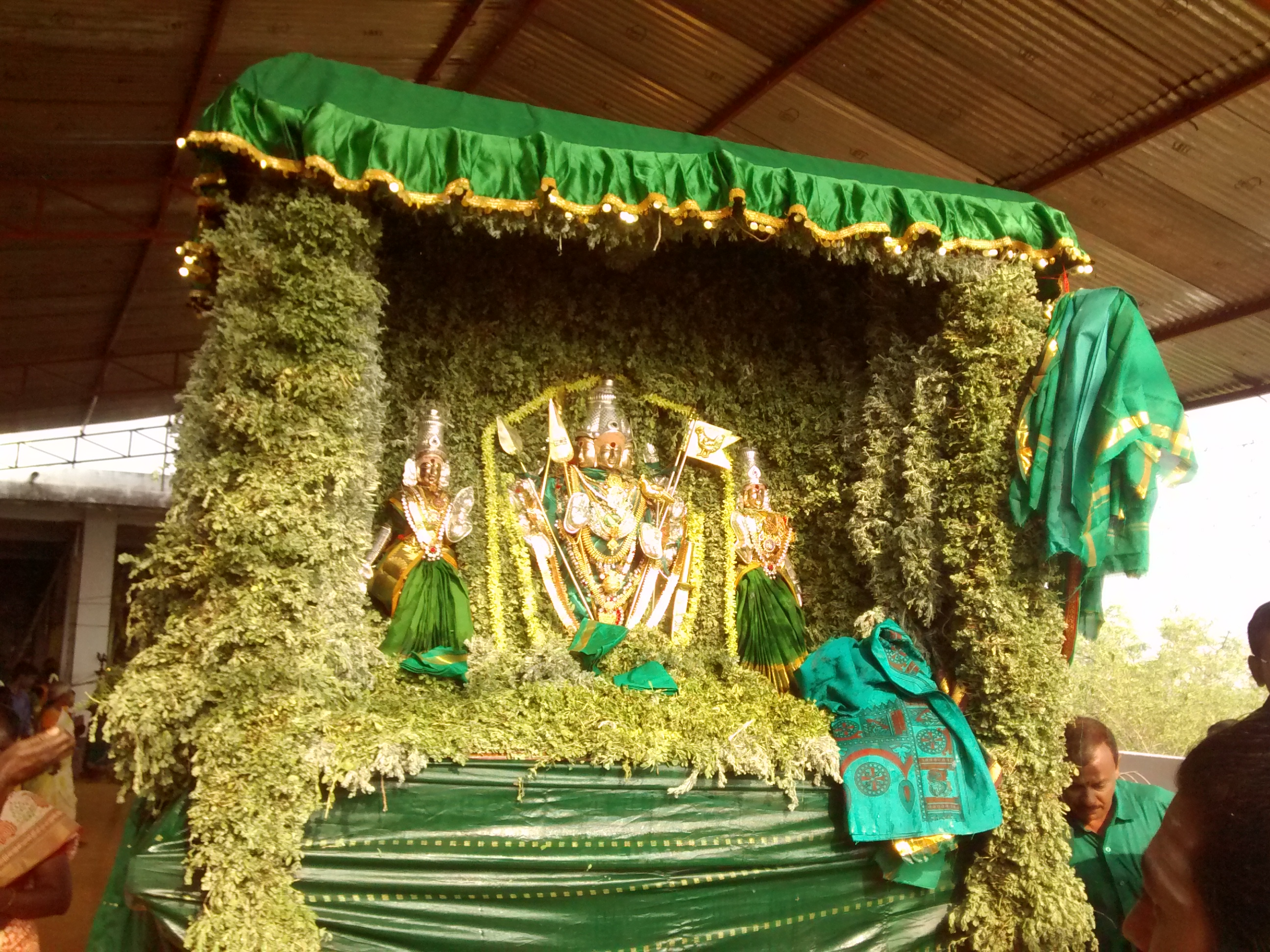
In green attire

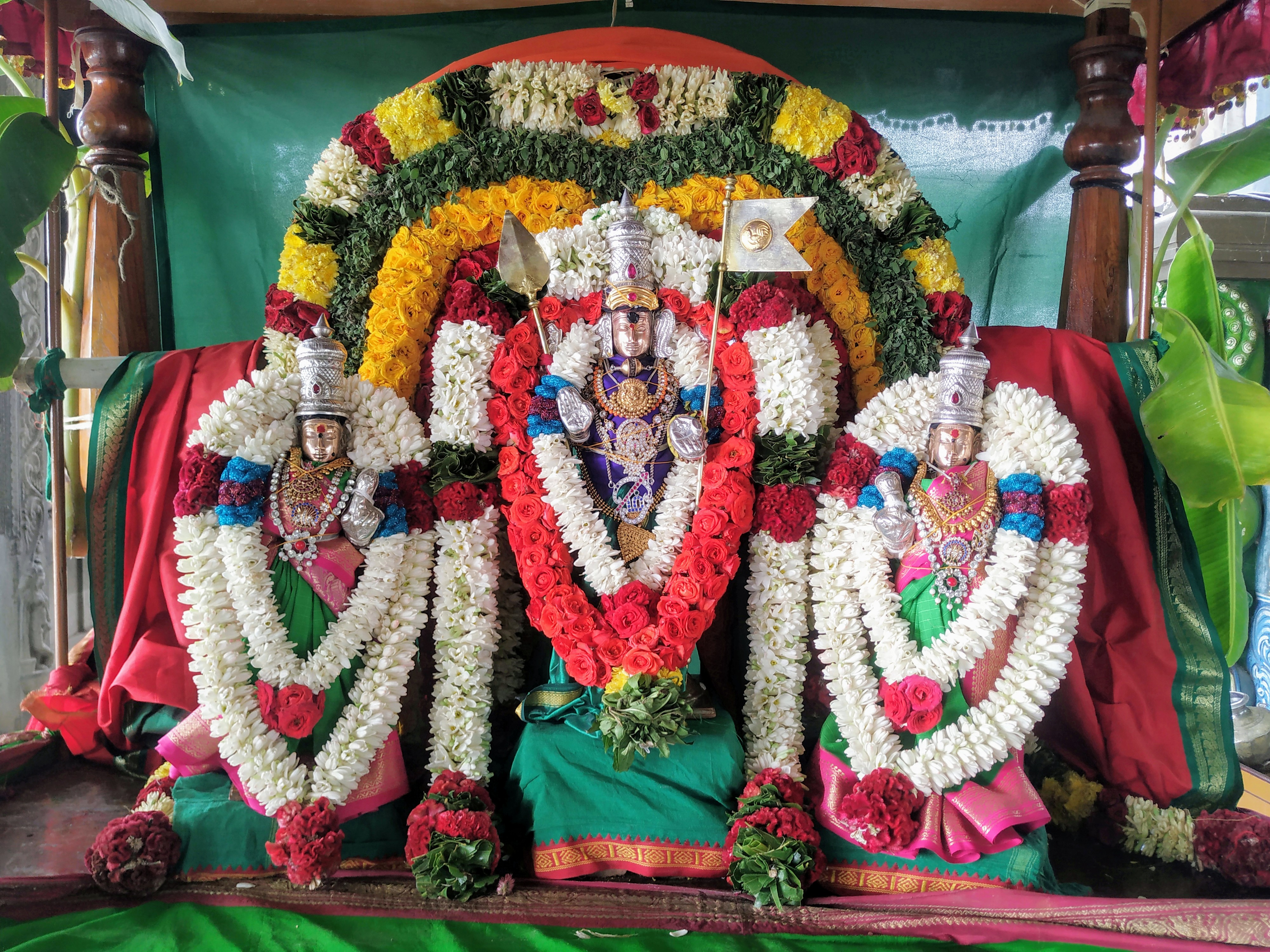
During Thaipusam
