= Pavalamalai Muthukumara Swamy Temple =

Temple in Tamil Nadu, India

- Location in Tamil Nadu

Religion
- Affiliation: Hinduism
- District: Erode
- Deity: Murugan
- Festivals: Thai Poosam; Panguni Uthiram; Kanda Sashti; Vaikasi Visakam

Location
- Location: Pavalamalai, Gobichettipalayam
- State: Tamil Nadu
- Country: India
- Interactive map of Pavalamalai Muthukumara Swamy Temple
- Coordinates: 11°27′34″N 77°27′14″E

Architecture
- Type: Dravidian architecture

The Pavalamalai Muthukumara Swamy Temple is a Hindu temple dedicated to Murugan, located near Gobichettipalayam in Tamil Nadu. The temple is located atop of a small hillock.

== Mythology and history ==
According to temple legend, the origins can be traced back to Hindu mythology. Vayu, the wind god, and Adhisesha, the lord of serpents, had a dispute as to who is stronger. While Vayu blew with full force, Adhisesha bound himself to the mythical Mount Meru. Parts of the mountain were dislodged due to the force of the wind, and fell to the Earth. One such piece formed the Pavala Malai, meaning hill of coral in Tamil language. As per Thiruvilaiyadal Puranam, when Murugan chose to retreat to the Palani Hills, he chose the hill as one of his abode, and a temple was built later. The hill finds mention in the Thirukutrala kuravanji composed by Thirigudarasapa Kavirayar in the 17th century CE.

== Shrines ==
The main deity is represented as a young and celibate Murugan. There are individual shrines for his consorts Deivanai and Valli. In the premises of the temple, there are shrines dedicated to various other Hindu gods and goddesses, including Ganapathy, Kailasanathar and his consort Periya Nayagi, and the Navagraha. Shiva is manifested as a swayambu lingam. There is also a shrine of Idumban.

== Practices and festivals ==
The Thiri Satha archanai (three hundred chants) is a special archana performed at the temple. As Murugan is considered to have six faces, fifty mantras are chanted per face. As per Hindu mythology, the mantra was used by the devas to worship Murugan. People worship the deity chanting the mantra to ward off ill effects, and for obtaining a blessing for a happy life. People also perform the archana and offer payasam, a sweet, to the deity on Tuesdays to ward of the evil effects of Mangala (Mars). Milk abhisheka is performed for Kailasanathar and Periya Nayagi on Tuesdays.

Special puja is conducted on the purnima day of the Tamil month of Chithirai. The annual temple car festival is celebrated during the month of Thai. Vaikasi Visakam is celebrated in the month of Vaikasi (May–June) and commemorates the birth of Murugan. Special puja and Homam is performed on the day. During the final day of Skanda Shashthi, Soorasamharam ritual, which signifies Murugan's vanquishing of the demon Surapadman, is celebrated. During Thaipusam, special abhisheka is performed and Murugan is decorated with flowers. A large lamp is usually lit on the occasion of Karthigai Deepam after pujas are performed. During the festivals, people often carry kavadi and milk pots, and other offerings to the deity.
