= Subramaniya Swamy Temple, Tiruchendur =

Murugan Temple in Thoothukudi district, Tamil Nadu, India

Subramanya Swamy Temple
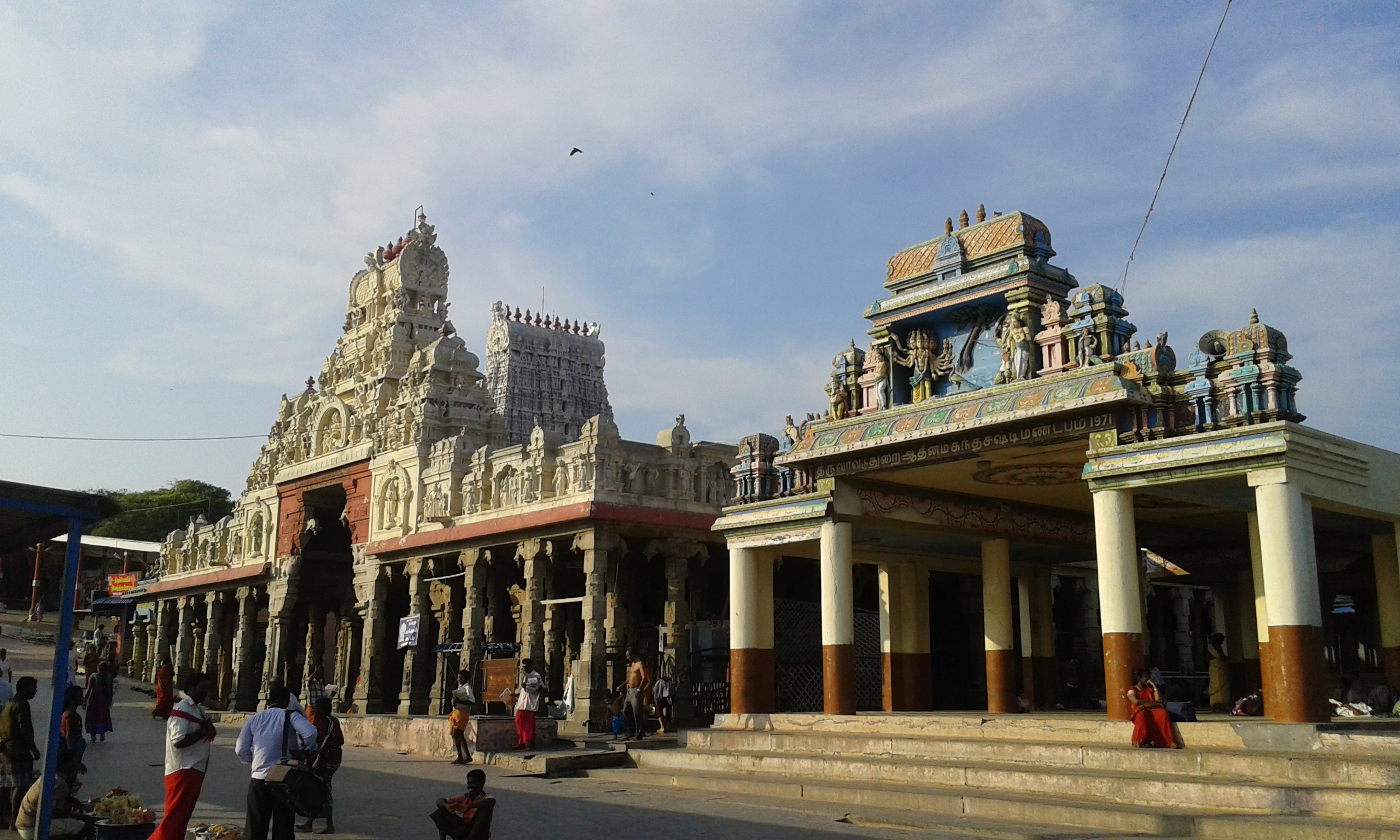
- Entrance to the temple

- Location in Tamil Nadu

Religion
- Affiliation: Hinduism
- District: Thoothukudi
- Deity: Murugan
- Festivals: Vaikasi Visakam; Surasamharam; Thaipusam
- Governing body: Hindu Religious and Charitable Endowments Department, Government of Tamil Nadu

Location
- Location: Tiruchendur, Thoothukudi district
- State: Tamil Nadu
- Country: India
- Coordinates: 8°29′45″N 78°7′45″E

Architecture
- Type: Tamil architecture

Website
- tiruchendurmurugan.hrce.tn.gov.in

Subramanya Swamy Temple is a Hindu temple dedicated to Hindu god Murugan, located in Thoothukudi district, Tamil Nadu. It is one of the Six Abodes of Murugan (Arupadai Veedu), a set of foremost and sacred Hindu temples, dedicated to Murugan. It is also one of the Vaippu Sthalams.

The temple complex is located in the eastern end of the town on the shores of the Laccadive Sea. It is maintained and administered by the Hindu Religious and Charitable Endowments Department of the Government of Tamil Nadu. In 2016, it was the fourth Hindu temple in Tamil Nadu to get an ISO certification. A reenactment of Surasamharam, the victory of Murugan over the asura Surapadman, is a major festival, and attracts thousands to the temple.

== Mythology ==
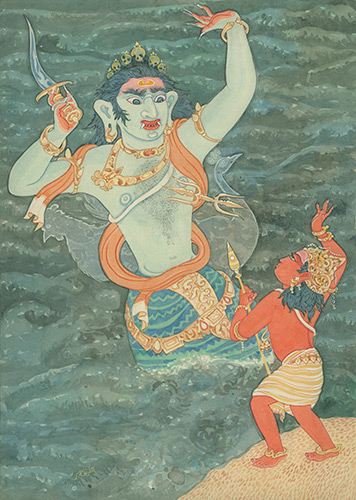
A painting depicting Murugan facing off Surapadma

The history of Thiruchendur is related to the mythology of Hindu god Murugan. According to the seventeenth-century CE text Kanda Puranam (the Tamil rendition of the older Skanda Purana), the asura brothers Surapadman, Simhamukhan and Tarakasuran performed tapas to Shiva, who granted them with various weapons and a wish wherein they could only be killed by the son of Shiva, which offered them near-immortality. They subsequently oppressed other celestial beings including the devas, and started a reign of tyranny in the three worlds. When the devas pleaded to Shiva for his assistance, Murugan was born, to take on the asuras. Shiva granted him celestial weapons and the divine spear vel, an embodiment of the power of Shakti (Parvati).

Texts Kanda Puranam and Kumarasambhavam recount a war fought by Murugan against the asuras. As Murugan was born to save the devas from the tyranny of the asuras, he was appointed as the commander of the devas and engaged in conflict with the asuras. Murugan killed Tarakasura and Simhamukha and faced off with Surapadma in the final battle in Tiruchendur. Surapadma took a large form with multiple heads, arms and legs trying to intimidate Murugan. When Murugan threw his vel, Surapadma escaped to the sea and took the form of a large mango tree, which spread across the three worlds. Murugan used his vel to split the tree in half, with each half transforming into a peacock and a rooster, respectively. After Surapadma was killed, Murugan took the peacock as his vahana and the rooster as his pennant.

A reenactment of Surasamharam, the victory of Murugan over the asura Surapadman, is a major festival, and attracts thousands to the temple.

== History ==
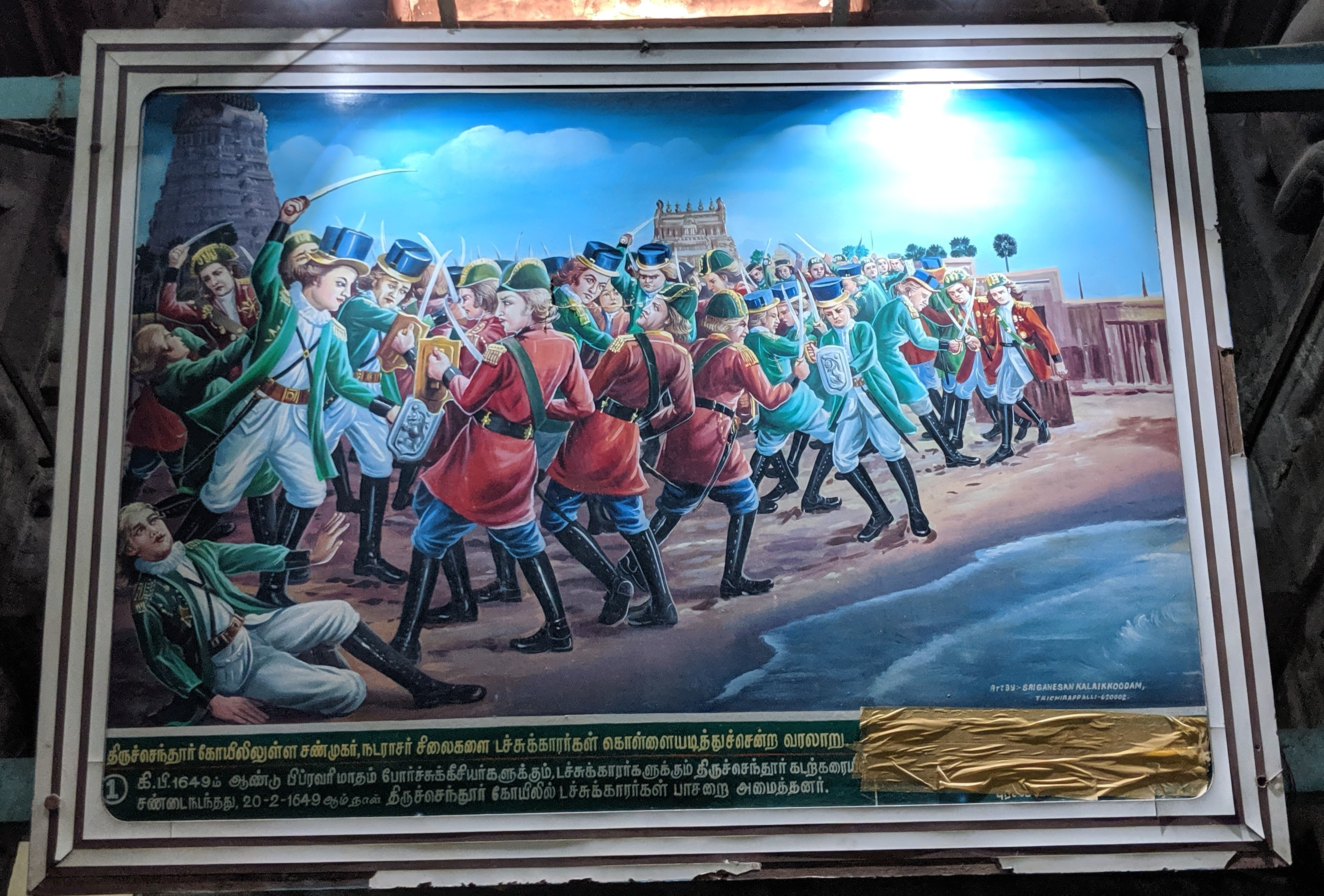
A painting illustrating the war between in 1649.

The temple complex at Tiruchendur was occupied by the Dutch East India Company from 1646 to 1648 CE, during the course of their war with the Portuguese. The local people tried to free the temple, and the Dutch were finally evicted from the temple on the orders of Thirumalai Nayak, the Nayak ruler of the region. However, while leaving, the Durch removed two utsava murtis (sculptures) of Murugan and took it with them. During their sea voyage, as they encountered strong winds, and dropped them in the middle of the sea. Vadamlaiyappa Pillai later retrieved the idols in 1653. The story is depicted in paintings inside the temple complex.

== Architecture ==
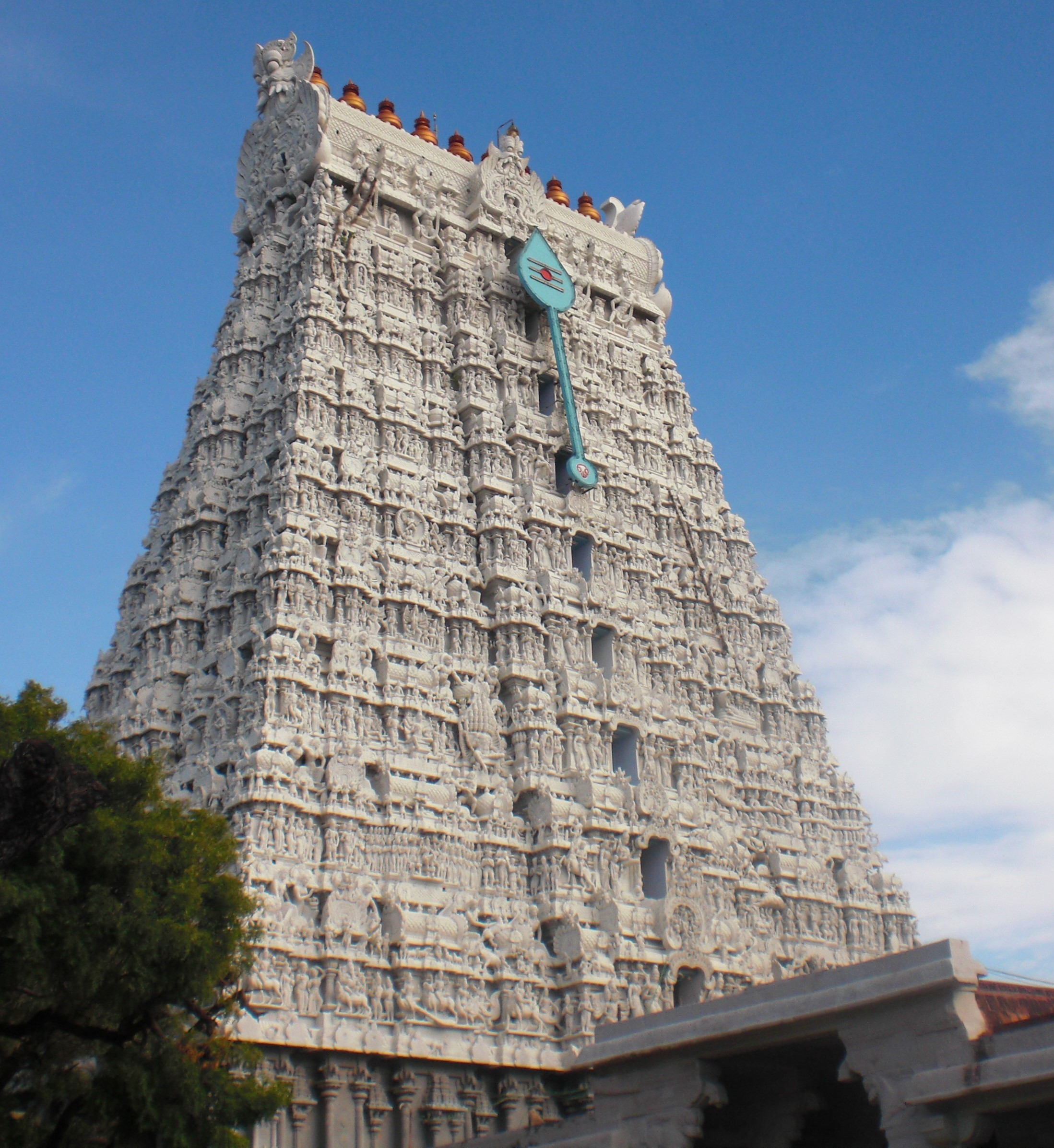
Rajagopuram

The temple is one of the Six Abodes of Murugan (Arupadai Veedu), a set of foremost and sacred Hindu temples, dedicated to Murugan. It is also one of the Vaippu Sthalams sung by Tamil Shaivite Nayanar Appar.

The temple complex is located in the eastern end of the town on the shores of the Gulf of Mannar. It measures 91 m (299 ft) north to south, 65 m (213 ft) east to west, and has a nine-tier gopuram (tower gate), that is 157 ft (48 m) high. The large gopuram is a prominent feature of the Hindu Tamil architecture.

The principal entrance faces south, and opens into the first of two prakarams, the first of which is lined with rows of yalis. The inner sanctum of the temple is in a cave and the main deity, or moolavar, is Murugan as a saintly child, portrayed in a granite carving.

Nali Kinaru, a sacred well fed by a freshwater spring, is located 100 m (330 ft) south of the temple. Devotees undergo a ritual cleansing by bathing in water from the well after bathing in the ocean.
