= Cock flag =

Flag of Hindu deity Kartikeya

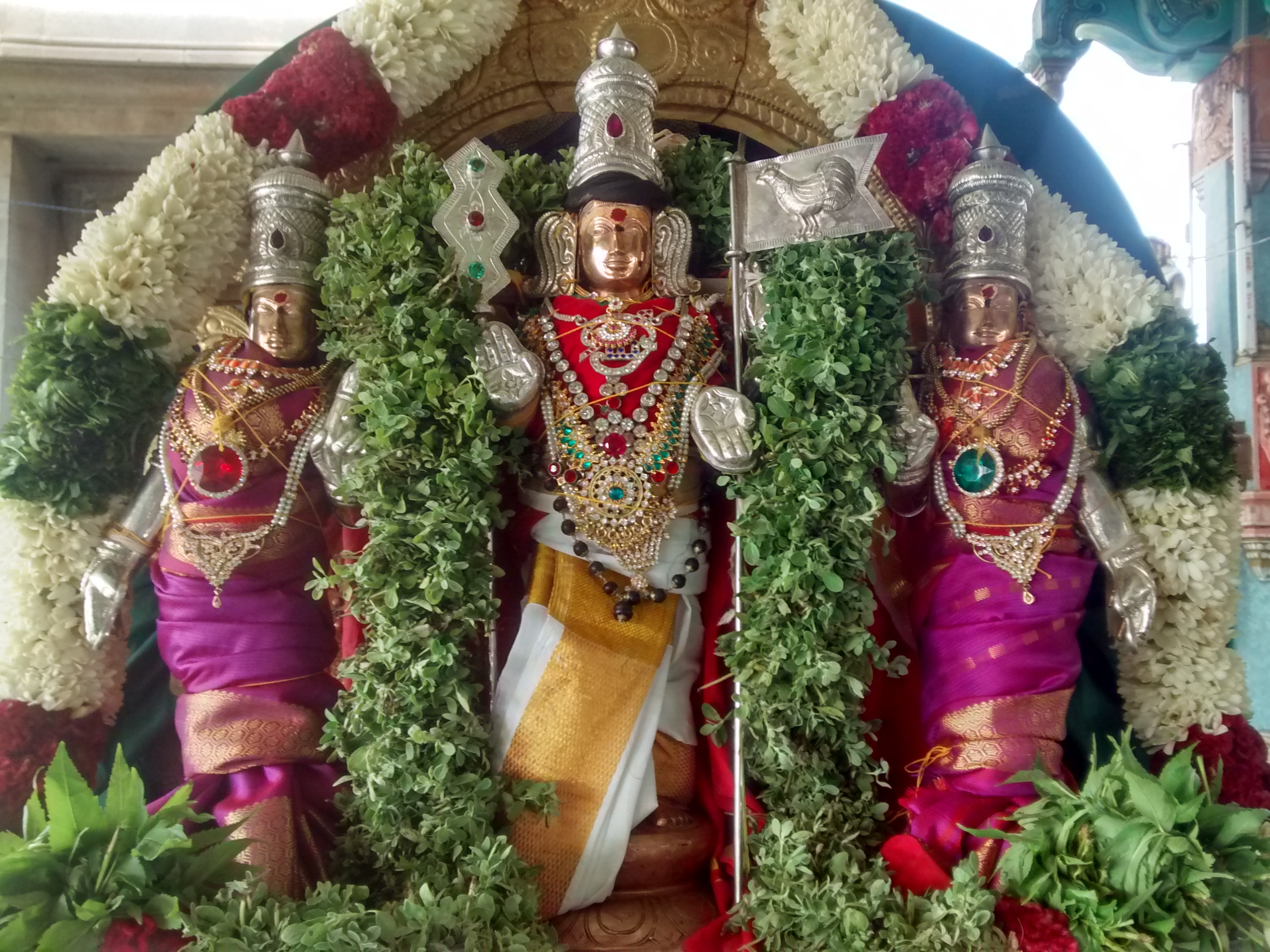
The Rooster flag present in the left hand of a statue of Murugan (middle).

The Rooster flag (Sanskrit: कुक्कुटध्वज, romanized: Kukkuṭadhvaja, Tamil: சேவல் கொடி, romanized: Céval koți) is the flag of the Hindu deity Kartikeya, also rendered Skanda, and Murugan in Tamil tradition. The deity Murugan is depicted with the divine spear vel in one hand and the rooster flag in the other in his iconography.

== Legend ==
According to the Kanda Puranam, the deity Murugan is regarded to have battled the asura Surapadman with the divine spear given to him by his mother, Parvati. After Surapadman had assumed the form of a tree, Murugan used his spear to split the asura into two. These halves became a peacock, which Murugan took as his mount, and a rooster, which he adopted as his flag. This legend is celebrated on the occasion of Skanda Shashti.

In the Mahabharata, the rooster is offered as the emblem of Skanda by Agni before his battle with Tarakasura.

== See also ==
- Vel
- Shankha
- Hindu iconography
