= Pachaimalai =

Pachaimalai may refer to:

- Pachaimalai Hills, hills which are part of Eastern Ghats in Tamil Nadu
- Pachaimalai Subramanya Swamy Temple, a Murugan temple near Gobichettipalayam, Tamil Nadu
