= Surasamharam =

Hindu folk ritual

- Also called: Suranporu
- Type: Hindu
- Significance: Victory of Kartikeya over Surapadma
- Date: Month of Ashvin (Aipasi in Tamil calendar)
- 2025 date: 27 October (Monday)
- 2026 date: 15 November (Sunday)
- Frequency: Annual
- Related to: Shashthi Vrata

Surasamharam (lit. 'killing of Sura') also called Suranporu, is a Hindu observance that commemorates the killing of Surapadma by Kartikeya. Cultural performances reenacting the incident are often staged during the festival. It is observed in the month of Ashvin (Aipasi in Tamil calendar) and marks the end of the six day Shashthi Vrata.

== Legend ==
According to the seventeenth-century CE text Kanda Puranam (the Tamil rendition of the older Skanda Purana), the asuras led by Surapadma performed tapas to Shiva, who granted them with various weapons and a wish wherein they could only be killed by the son of Shiva, which offered them near-immortality. They subsequently oppressed other celestial beings including the devas, and started a reign of tyranny in the three worlds. When the devas pleaded to Shiva for his assistance, divine sparks emerged from him, which later developed into Kartikeya.

Kartikeya led the army of the devas against the asuras. He killed the other asuras, and faced off with Surapadma in the final battle. Kartikeya used his vel (divine spear) to split Surapadma, with each half transforming into a peacock and a rooster, respectively. After Surapadma was killed, Kartikeya took the peacock as his vahana and the rooster as his pennant.

== Occurrence ==
Surasamharam commemorates the killing of Surapadma by Kartikeya. The observance marks the end of the six day Shashthi Vrata or Kanda Shasti festivities. The vrata is observed on the first six days of the Shukla paksha (waxing moon) in the month of Ashvin (Aipasi in Tamil calendar).

== Practices ==
During Surasamharam, cultural performances reenacting the incident of Kartikeya killing the asuras are often staged during the festival. During the festival, the Kanda Purana, which describes the event, is narrated in the temples. During the performance, the symbolic killing of Surapadma and other asuras such as Anamuga, Panumuga, and Sinkhamuga, using the vel is enacted. Images of the asuras are often made from wood or cardboard, stuffed with hay, rags, and cloth, decorated with coloured paper, and mounted on wooden or bamboo platforms. The images also vary in size, with some reaching up to 15 ft (4.6 m) in height. During the enactment, these large figures are symbolically attacked by the idol of Kartikeya, who wields a vel and the detachable head of the asura images are removed, depicting the beheading. It is often accompanied by traditional music instruments such as thapattai and chenda. The performance of the "tiru kalyanam", the ceremonial wedding ceremony of Kartikeya and Devasena marks the end of the event.

At Subramaniya Swamy Temple, Tiruchendur, where Kartikeya is said to have killed the asuras, the enactment of Surasamharam is preceded by special pujas and abhishekam, and the festival attracts thousands. It is celebrated as a major festival at the Dhandayuthapani Swamy Temple at Palani, and the idol of Kartikeya is taken on a procession through the town before the Surasamharam event. It is also observed in few regions such as Palakkad district in Kerala, and parts of Sri Lanka.
