= Sree Soepramaniem Nagarattar Temple =

Hindu place of worship on Sumatra, Indonesia

- ஸ்ரீ சுப்ரமணியம் நாகரத்தர் கோயில் Kuil Sree Soepramaniem Nagarattar
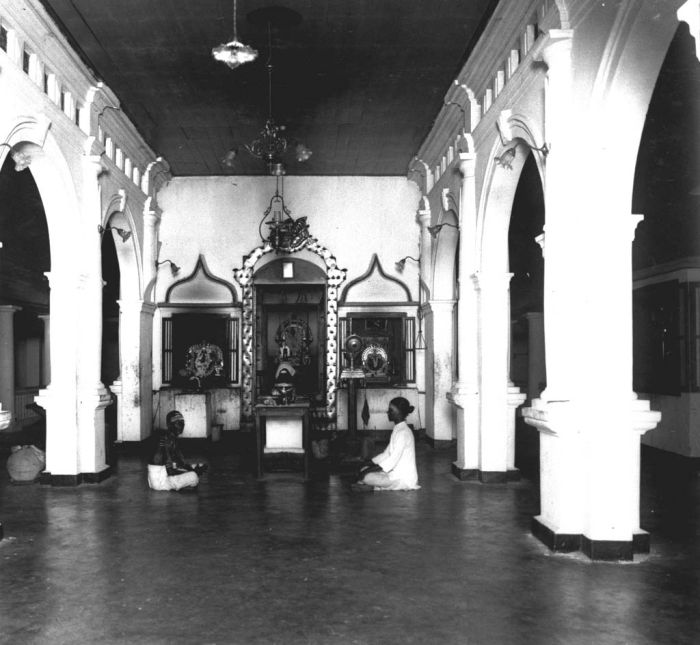
- Inside the temple, circa 1925

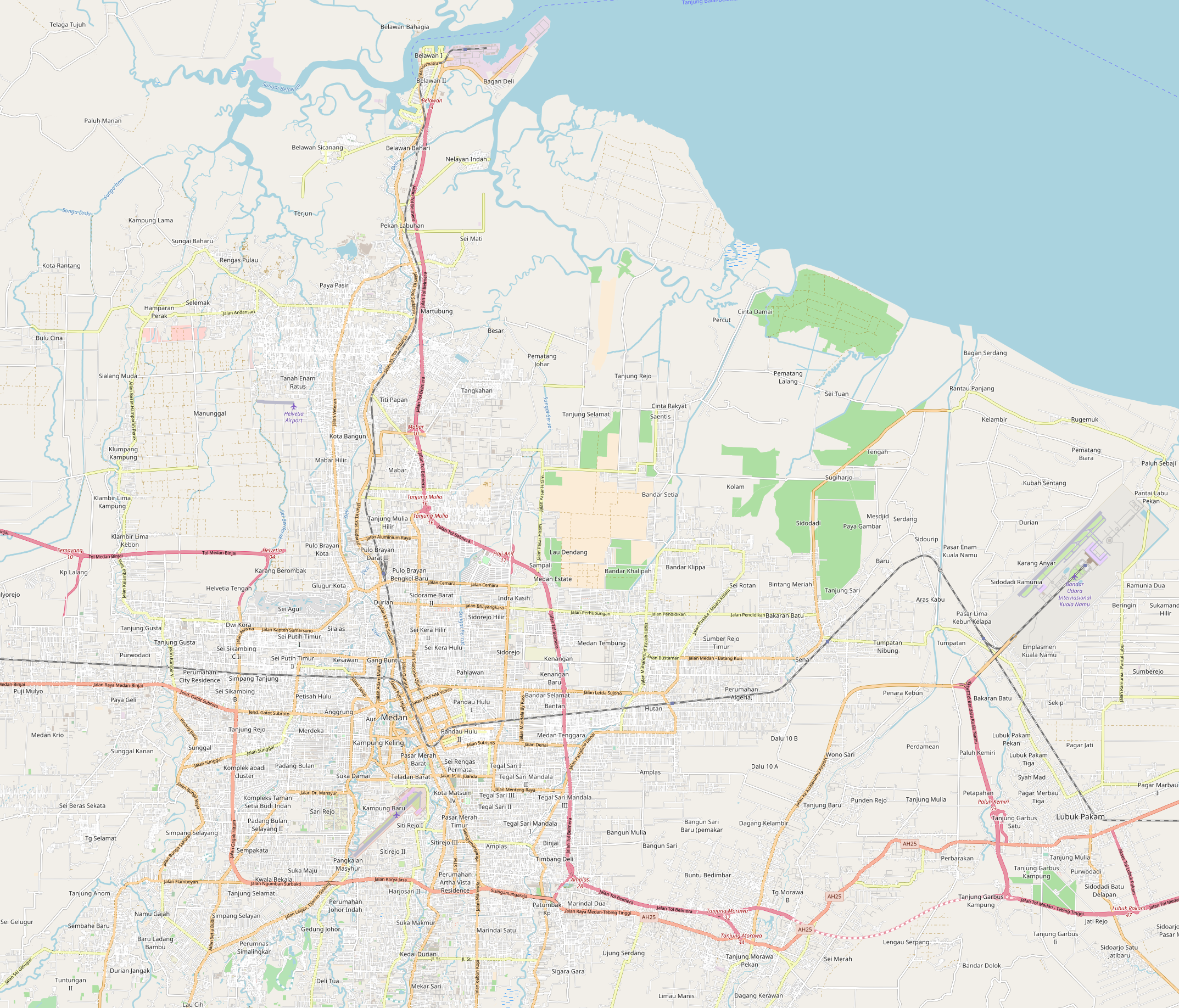
- Location in Medan, Indonesia

Religion
- Affiliation: Hinduism
- District: Medan Petisah
- Deity: Murugan, Ganesha, Shiva
- Festival: Thaipusam

Location
- Location: Medan
- State: North Sumatera
- Country: Indonesia
- Interactive map of Sree Soepramaniem Nagarattar Temple
- Coordinates: 3.587098210282087°N 98.6690912644686°E

Architecture
- Type: Dravidian architecture
- Completed: 1892

Sree Soepramaniem Nagarattar Temple or Nagarathar Temple is one of the oldest Hindu temples in Medan, Indonesia. This temple is dedicated to Lord Murugan or also known as Subramaniam who is one of the main deities among Tamil people. This temple plays an important role in preserving the cultural and spiritual heritage of the Tamil community in Medan. Apart from being a place of worship, the temple is also a symbol of togetherness and cultural identity for the Indian Indonesians community, especially those of Tamil descents. This temple is famous for the celebration of Thaipusam, a hundred year old wooden chariot which is locally known as Radhoo is placed in this temple, and it will be carried around during Thaipusam festival to Sri Mariamman Temple, Medan.

== History ==
The Sree Soepramaniem Nagarattar Temple was built by the Chettiar community of the Tamils, which also known as the Natukotai Chettiar. This community originated from Tamil Nadu, India, and has a long history of trade and other economic activities among Southeast Asia, mainly in Indonesia, Malaysia and Singapore. They brought their religious and cultural traditions to Medan, including the establishment of this temple, which has become a spiritual and cultural center for the early Tamil community in Dutch East Indies era. The temple is not only a place of worship but also an important symbol of their heritage and identity.

== Gallery ==
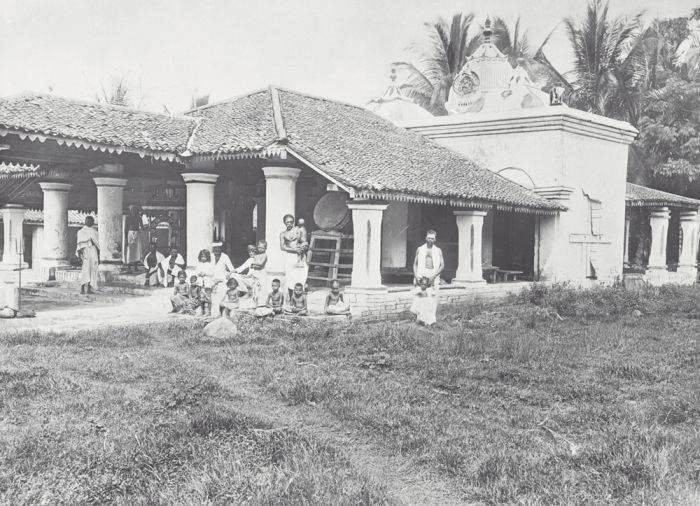
The devotees taking picture outside the temple, circa 1900-1923s
