= Thaipusam =

Tamil Hindu festival

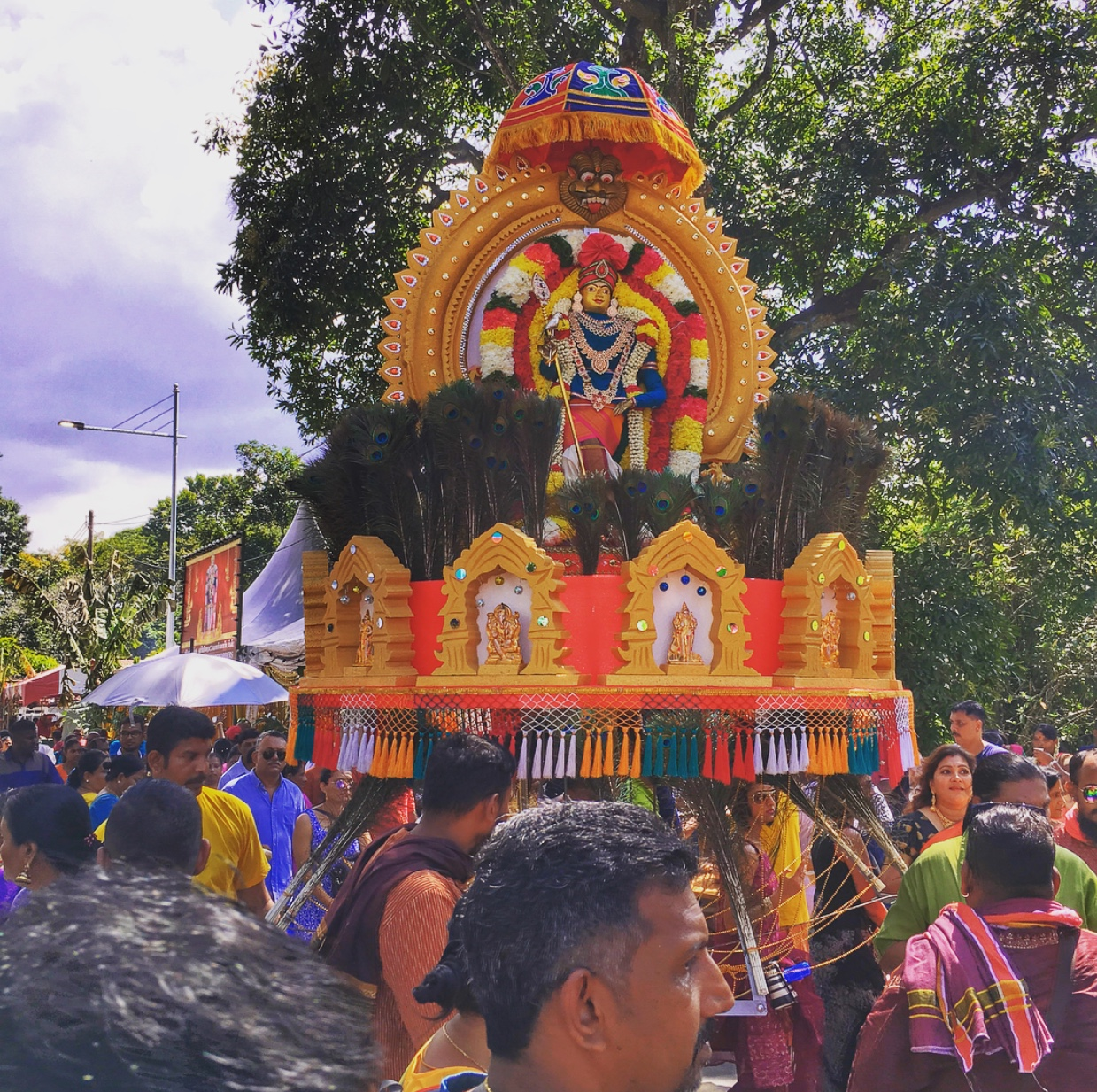
- Chariot of Murugan during Thaipusam festivities in Malaysia
- Observed by: Primarily Tamil Hindus in India, Sri Lanka, Malaysia, Singapore, Indonesia, Southeast Asia, Caribbean, Mauritius, Fiji, South Africa and United States
- Type: Hindu
- Significance: Commemoration of Murugan's victory over Surapadman
- Celebrations: Kavadi Aattam
- Date: First full moon coinciding with Pusa nakshatra in the Tamil month of Thai
- 2026 date: Sunday, 1 February

Thaipusam or Thaipoosam (Tamil: Taippūcam, IPA: [t̪əjppuːsəm]) is a Tamil Hindu festival celebrated on the first full moon day of the Tamil month of Thai coinciding with Pusam star. The festival is celebrated to commemorate the victory of Hindu god Murugan over the demon Surapadman. During the battle, Murugan is believed to have wielded a vel, a divine spear granted by his mother, Parvati.

The festival includes ritualistic practices of Kavadi Aattam, a ceremonial act of sacrifice carrying a physical burden as a means of balancing a spiritual debt. Worshipers often carry a pot of cow milk as an offering and also do mortification of the flesh by piercing the skin, tongue or cheeks with vel skewers. Devotees prepare for the rituals by keeping clean, doing regular prayers, following a vegetarian diet and fasting while remaining celibate.

Thaipusam is observed by Tamils in India, Sri Lanka, Southeast Asia notably in Malaysia, Singapore, and Indonesia. It is also observed by other countries with significant Tamil diaspora like Fiji, Mauritius, Seychelles, South Africa, Canada, the Caribbean countries including Trinidad and Tobago and Guyana, and in countries with significant Indian migrants like the United States. It is a public holiday in Mauritius, select states in Malaysia and in the Indian state of Tamil Nadu.

== Etymology ==
Thaipusam is a compound of two Tamil words: Tamil month of Thai and the name of the star Pusam, denoting the day of occurrence of the festival.

== Theology ==
According to the Kanda Puranam (the Tamil version of the Skanda Purana), three asuras (a race of celestial beings) Surapadman, Tarakasuran, and Singamukhan performed austerities to propitiate the Hindu god Shiva. Shiva granted them various boons which gave them near-immortality and the ability to conquer the three worlds. They subsequently started a reign of tyranny in their respective realms and oppressed the celestial beings including the devas and other people. The devas pleaded Shiva for his assistance to put an end to the reign of Surapadman and the asuras. In response, Shiva manifested five additional heads and a divine spark emerged from each of the six heads. Initially, the wind-god Vayu carried the sparks, but the fire-god Agni took possession of them afterwards because of the unbearable heat. Agni deposited the sparks in the Ganga river. The water in the Ganga started evaporating due to intense heat, and so the goddess Ganga took them to the Saravana lake, where each of the sparks developed into a baby boy. The six boys were raised by handmaidens known as the Kṛttikās and they were later fused into one by Parvati, thus giving rise to the six-headed Murugan.

Parvati granted him a divine spear known as the vel. Murugan was accompanied by Virabahu who served as his commander-in-chief and eight others, who were sons bore by nine shaktis who arose from the gems of the broken anklet of Parvati, when she ran from her seat due to the heat generated by the sparks emanating from Shiva. Along with the armies of the devas, Murugan waged war on the asuras. Murugan split Surapadman into two with his vel and the two halves transformed into a mango tree and later into a peacock and a rooster. Murugan adopted the peacock as his mount and took the rooster as his flag. Thaipusam festival is celebrated to commemorate the victory of Murugan over the Surapadman.

Murugan is a deity associated with yogic discipline and austerities in Hinduism and is regarded by his adherents to be capable of offering mukti (spiritual liberation) to those who venerate him.

== Occurrence ==
Thaipusam occurs annually and is celebrated on the full moon day in the Tamil month of Thai on the confluence of star Pusam.

== Practices ==
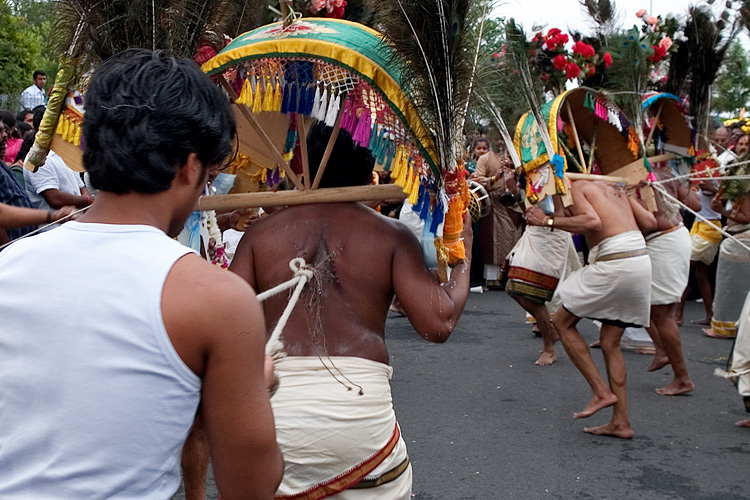
A Kavadi procession

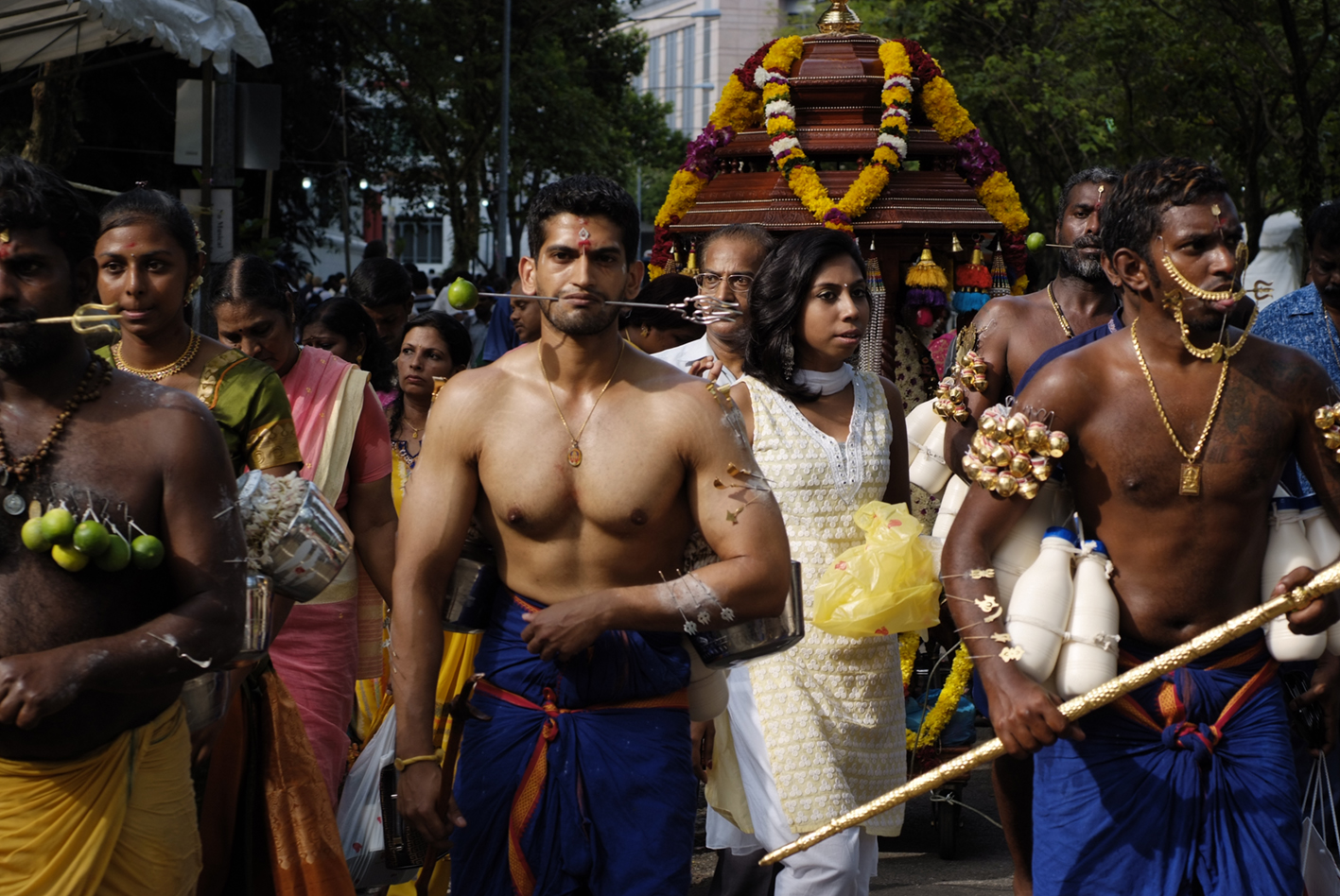
Ritual piercing during Thaipusam

Kavadi Aattam is a ceremonial act of sacrifice and offering practiced by devotees during the Thaipusam festival. It forms a central part of the festival and symbolizes a form of debt bondage. Kavadi (meaning "burden" in Tamil) is a physical burden which consists of a semicircular piece of wood or steel which are bent and attached to a cross structure in its simplest form, that is balanced on the shoulders of the devotee. By bearing the Kavadi, the devotees implore Murugan for assistance, usually as a means of balancing a spiritual debt or on behalf of a loved one who is in need of help or healing. Worshipers often carry one or more pots of cow milk as an offering (pal kavadi) or other objects such as sugarcane, tender coconut, and flowers. The most extreme and spectacular practice is the carrying of Vel kavadi, a portable altar up to 2 metres (6 ft 7 in) tall and weighing up to 30 kg (66 lb), decorated with peacock feathers and is attached to the body of the devotee through multiple skewers and metal hooks pierced into the skin on the chest and back.

People also do a form of mortification of the flesh by piercing the skin, tongue or cheeks with vel skewers and flagellation. Since public self mutilation is prohibited by Indian law, these practices are limited in India. Vibuthi, a type of holy ash is spread across the body including the piercing sites. Drumming and chanting of verses help the devotees enter a state of trance. Devotees usually prepare for the rituals by keeping clean, doing regular prayers, following a vegetarian diet and fasting while remaining celibate. They make pilgrimage with bare feet and dance along the route while bearing these burdens.

== Areas of practice ==
=== India ===
Thai pusam is a major festival in the Murugan temples including the six abodes in South India. In Dhandayuthapani Swamy Temple in Palani, the festival is celebrated over ten days known as Brahmotsavam. At Subramaniya Swamy Temple, Tiruchendur, where Murugan was supposed to have emerged victorious against the asuras, the festival attracts lakhs of pilgrims every year for the ritual procession. A float festival is held every year in the temple tanks in Meenakshi Temple in Madurai and Kapaleeshwarar Temple, Mylapore, Chennai. The festival is also observed as Thaipooyam Mahotsavam in Kerala. In 2021, the festival was declared a public holiday in the Indian state of Tamil Nadu.

=== Outside India ===
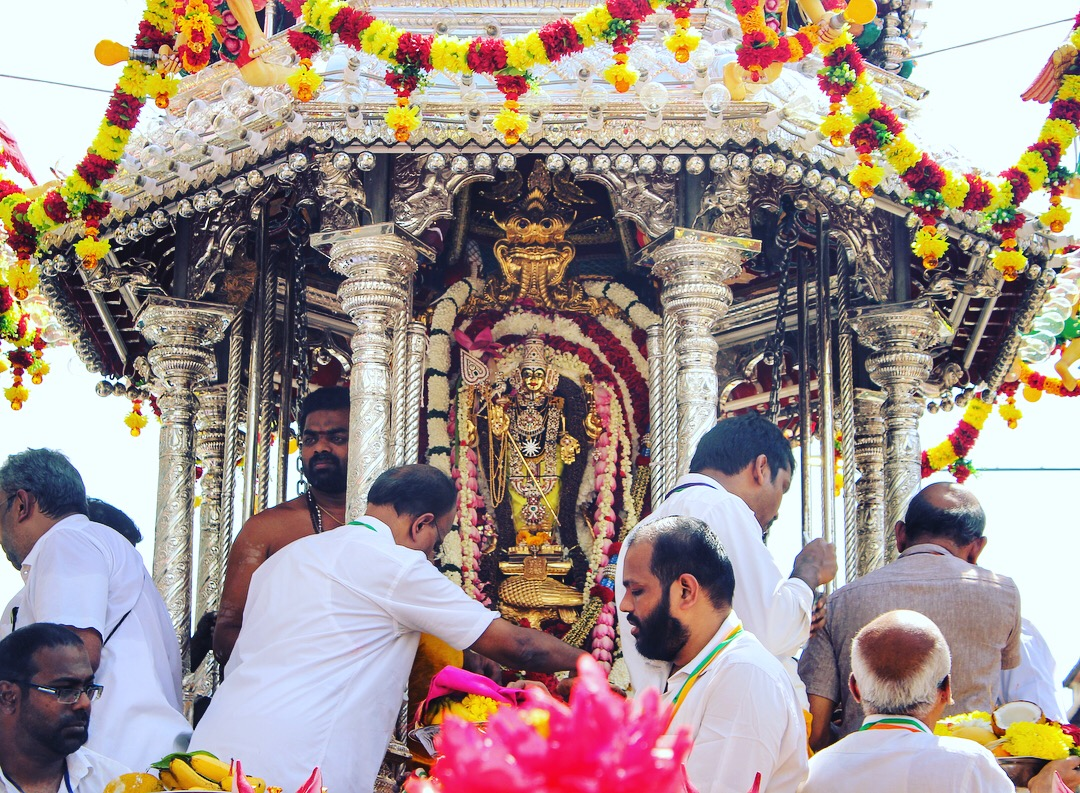
Thai pusam procession in Penang, Malaysia

While the festival originated in India, it has spread across other countries with significant Tamil diaspora. It is celebrated in a much larger scale in some of the countries outside India. It is celebrated in Sri Lanka, Myanmar, and countries in Southeast Asia notably in Malaysia, Singapore, and Indonesia. It is also celebrated in other countries with significant people of Tamil origin like Fiji, Mauritius, Seychelles, South Africa, Canada, the Caribbean countries including Trinidad and Tobago, and countries with significant Indian migrants like the United States.

In Malaysia, the festival attracts thousands of people for the elaborate festivities at Batu Caves near Kuala Lumpur and Arulmigu Balathandayuthapani Temple, Penang. In Singapore, devotees start the procession at Sri Srinivasa Perumal Temple carrying milk pots and kavadis with spikes pierced on their body and proceeds towards Sri Thendayuthapani Temple. Thaipusam in Mauritius is celebrated with thousands of attendees taking the ritual 'Cavadee' from Kovil Montagne. In South Africa, Thaipusam Kavady is celebrated in Durban, Clairwood Shree Siva Soobramonior Temple in Cape Town and Shree Sivasubramaniar Alayam in Palm Ridge. At Fiji, the festival is celebrated at Sri Siva Subrahmanya Swami Temple in Nadi town and at the Sri Raj Mahamariamman Temple in Suva. In Indonesia, the festival is celebrated in Medan, Binjai, Jakarta and Banda Aceh. At Medan, thousands accompany a hundred year old chariot locally known as Radhoo from Sree Soepramaniem Nagarattar Temple to Sri Mariamman Temple at Kampung Madras. In the US, the festival is celebrated in various Hindu temples across the country.

It is a national holiday in Mauritius and a state holiday in Kuala Lumpur, Johor, Negeri Sembilan, Penang, Perak, Putrajaya and Selangor in Malaysia. It was a declared national holiday in Singapore till 1968.

== See also ==
- Hinduism in Southeast Asia
- Shakambhari Purnima
