= Shashthi Vrata =

Hindu observance

- Also called: Kanda Sashti
- Type: Hindu
- Significance: Kartikeya's penance before his war with Surapadma
- Begins: Day after Dipavali Amavasya
- Ends: Shasthi tithi (Surasamharam)
- Date: Month of Ashvin
- 2026 date: 10–17 November
- Frequency: Annual

The Shashthi Vrata (Sanskrit: Ṣaṣṭhīvrata), also known as Kanda Sashti, is a fasting observance dedicated to Hindu god Kartikeya. It is primarily observed by South Indian Hindus during the month of Ashvin. The fasting is observed for six days starting from the first day after Amavasya (new moon). It ends on the day of Shashthi tithi with the commemoration of Surasamharam.

== Observance ==
Hindus observe the vrata (fasting) for six days during the month of Ashvin. It begins on the first day after the Amavasya (new moon) on Diwali, and ends on the sixth tithi (day) of Shashthi. Surasamharam marks the end of the observance. While the vrata is largely dedicated to the deity Kartikeya, it is also prescribed for the worship of the Sun god Surya in some of the Hindu texts.

== Mythology ==
According to Tamil mythology, Kartikeya is stated to have performed a yajna for six consecutive days during the month to be blessed by his father Shiva before going to war with the asura Surapadma, making the practice auspicious. Soorasamharam marks the event in which Kartikeya defeated the demon Surapadman.

== Practices ==
As per Kanda Puranam, one must bathe early on all six days of this occasion, fast for six days continuously, and worship Kartikeya as prescribed. Prayers are made to Ganesha to invoke his blessings before the fast. A puja is performed, venerating the image of Kartikeya, a kalasha, and Agni. Modaks and other offerings are presented to the deity. Various mantras are chanted during the observance. After the period of fasting, special pujas are prescribed, and Brahmins are invited and fed. These practices are described as means to allow the performer to achieve a higher status.
