= Ashvin (month) =

Seventh month of the Hindu calendar

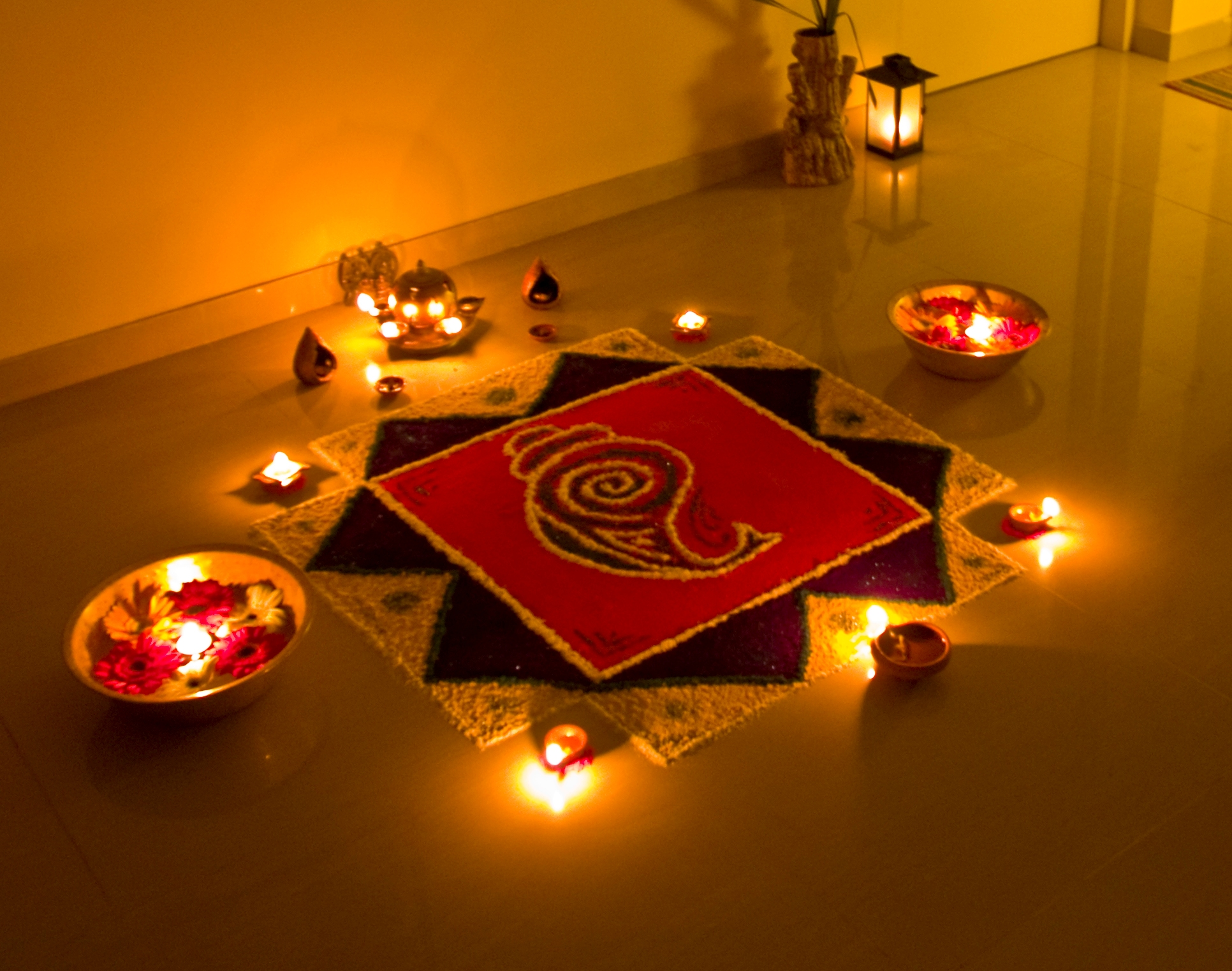
- Diwali, the major Hindu festival of lights is celebrated during the month
- Native name: आश्विन (Sanskrit)
- Calendar: Hindu calendar
- Month number: 7
- Number of days: 29 or 30
- Season: Sharada (autumn)
- Gregorian equivalent: September–October
- Significant days: Diwali (Note: As per Amanta tradition, which is officially followed by the Indian national calendar. The Hindu calendar follows two various systems:Amanta and Purnimanta. As per the amānta tradition, the lunar month ends on the new moon day and as per the purnimānta tradition, it ends on the full moon day. As a consequence, in the amanta tradition, Shukla Paksha (waxing moon) precedes Krishna Paksha (waning moon) in every lunar month, whereas the reverse happens in purnimānta tradition. Hence, Shukla Paksha will always belong to the same month in both traditions, whereas Krishna Paksha will always be associated with different but succeeding months in each tradition.); Durga Puja; Kali Puja; Karwa Chauth; Sharada Navaratri; Sharad Purnima; Vijayadashami

Ashvin (/əˈʃwɪn/; Sanskrit: आश्विन; Malay/Indonesian: Aswin; Thai: Asawin), or Ashwin, also known as Aswayuja, is the seventh month of the Hindu lunar calendar and the Indian national calendar. The name of the month is derived from the position of the Moon near the Ashvini nakshatra (star) on the full moon day. The month corresponds to the autumn (Sharada) season and falls in September–October of the Gregorian calendar.

In the Hindu solar calendar, it corresponds to the month of Kanya and begins with the Sun's entry into Virgo. It corresponds to Ashshin, the sixth month in the Bengali calendar. In the Tamil calendar, it corresponds to the seventh month of Aipasi, falling in the Gregorian months of October–November. In the Vaishnav calendar, it corresponds to the seventh month of Padmanabha.

In the Hindu lunar calendar, each month has 29 or 30 days. The month begins on the next day after Amavasya (new moon) or Purnima (full moon) as per the amanta and purnimanta systems, respectively. A month consists of two cycles of 15 days each, Shukla Paksha (waxing moon) and Krishna Paksha (waning moon). Days in each cycle is labeled as a thithi, with each thithi repeating twice in a month. In the Bengali calendar, it earlier consisted of 30 days before being revised to 31 days in Bangladesh in October 2019.

Diwali, the festival of lights, and Navaratri are two major Hindu festivals celebrated in the month of Ashwin.

== Etymology ==
The name of the month is derived from Ashvini, which is the first of the 27 nakshatras (star). It is based on the position of the Moon near the star on the full moon day. In Indian astrology, it is the head of the constellation Aries. In Hindu mythology, Ashvins are divine twin horsemen, who are associated with healing and are considered the bringers of dawn. In Thai, Aswin means a warrior or knight, and are described as representing the "blending of light and darkness" during twilight.

== Festivals ==
=== Diwali ===
Diwali is a five‑day Hindu festival of lights marking the victory of light over darkness, or good over evil. Dhanteras marks the first day of the festival and is celebrated on Trayodashi (thirteenth lunar day) of Krishna Paksha (waning moon) of the month. It is dedicated to the worship of goddess Lakshmi, lord Kubera and lord Dhanvantari. Naraka Chaturdasi is celebrated on the next day (Chaturdashi) and commemorates the defeat of Narakasura by god Krishna. Lakshmi Puja is celebrated on the Amavasya (new moon), and marks the main night of festivities. It is dedicated to welcoming prosperity by worshipping Lakshmi, the Hindu goddess of wealth. On this day, people light lamps (diyas), burst crackers, and do pujas.

The festivities and traditions vary across regions and commemorate other Hindu gods and goddesses. Kali Puja is celebrated in parts of India during the new moon day, and is dedicated to goddess Kali. While primarily a Hindu festival, variations of Diwali are also celebrated by adherents of other faiths. For Jains, own Diwali marks the final liberation of Mahavira. Sikhs celebrate Bandi Chhor Divas to mark the release of Guru Hargobind from Mughal imprisonment. Newar Buddhists also celebrate Diwali.

=== Navaratri ===
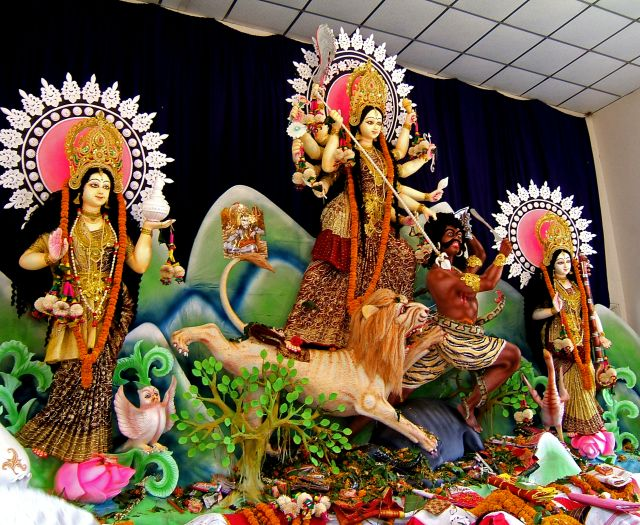
Durga Puja is a major festival in Bengal region

Navaratri is a nine‑day festival dedicated to various Hindu goddesses. It starts from the Prathama (first lunar day) thithi after Amavasya (new moon), and ends on the Navami (ninth lunar day) thithi. The festival involves fasting, special pujas, and various cultural activities.

Saraswati Puja or Ayutha Puja is celebrated on the ninth day of Navaratri. This day involves the worship of various tools, instruments, and books, and is dedicated to Saraswati, the Hindu goddess of wisdom. In households and institutions, materials and implements are cleaned and decorated, with special pujas. Vijayadashami or Dussehra is celebrated on Dashami (tenth day) thithi, and marks the end of Navaratri festivities. It commemorates god Rama's victory over Ravana.

Durga Puja is a major festival in Eastern India, specially in West Bengal. Celebrated during the Navaratri period, it commemorates goddess Durga's victory over Mahishasura. Pujas are performed in homes and in temporary public structures known as pandals, accompanied with religious recitations, cultural performances, feasting, and processions.

=== Karwa Chauth ===
Karwa Chauth is a one‑day fast observed by married Hindu women for the longevity and well‑being of their husbands. Women break the fast at night when the moon is sighted. Rituals include wearing traditional attires, communal gatherings, and offering prayers to the moon.

=== Sharad Poornima ===
Sharad Poornima is observed on the Purnima (full moon day) of the month of Ashvin. It marks the end of monsoon season. During the festival, various Hindu gods are worshipped along with Chandra, the moon deity, and are offered flowers and sweets.

== See also ==
- Astronomical basis of the Hindu calendar
- Hindu astrology
- Hindu calendar
- Indian astronomy
- Indian units of measurement
