= Thirukutrala kuravanji =

Thirukutrala Kuravanji is a classic Tamil language poem composed by Thirigudarasapa Kavirayar around 1600–1700 CE.

The poem is about a young girl who dreams about romantic love of Eesan (lord Shiva), manifested as Kutralanathar, a hero dwelling at the Kutralam temple in modern-day Tamil Nadu.

Kuravanji is a folk dance drama, which blends classical and folk art. Its poetry is written with specific sections and arrangements, the most famous of which are the "Kurathi" songs.

The "Kurathi" songs praise the wealth and beauty of her land and the hero of the poetry. Kurathi is a native Tamil woman of a specific clan, well versed in fortune telling. Kurathi women lived in the highlands of Tamil Nadu during the time this poem was composed.

== Plot ==
Thirukutrala Kuravanji is about a girl named Vasanthavalli living in a small village in Tamilagam. Her friends start talking to her about the glory of Kutralanathar. As a result of these conversations, Vasanthavalli starts dreaming about Kutralanathar as her lover.

Vasanthavalli seeks advice from Kurathi, the fortune teller, who predicts her union with Kutralanathar. This is a major section of the poem, in which Vasanthavalli describes the beauty of Kutralam, its nearby waterfall, and Kutralanathar.

== Songs ==
Thirukutrala Kuravanji contains several songs about nature and the flora and fauna of the Thiriguda Hills (kutralam). This is one example.

வானரங்கள் கனிகொடுத்து மந்தியொடு கொஞ்சும்

மந்திசிந்து கனிகளுக்கு வான்கவிகள் கெஞ்சும்

கானவர்கள் விழியெறிந்து வானவரை அழைப்பார்

கமனசித்தர் வந்துவந்து காயசித்தி விளைப்பார்

தேனருவித் திரையெழும்பி வானின்வழிஒழுகும்

செங்கதிரோன் பரிக்காலும் தேர்க்காலும் வழுகும்

கூனலிளம் பிறைமுடித்த வேணியலங் காரர்

குற்றாலத் திரிகூட மலையெங்கள் மலையே.

Kuravanji poems are used in dance forms like Bharatanatyam where dancers perform the roles of Kurathi and other characters as depicted in the poetry with recitations of the poems with music.

== Author ==
Trikutarasabba Kavirayar was a courtier in the court of the Northern King Chinnananjath Thevar.

Kavirayar comes from Melakaram near Tenkasi in Tirunelveli district (the brother of Subramania Dhesikar, the Adinath leader of Thiruvaduthurai).

The poem was staged in the presence of Thirukutralanadar, and received the praise and prize of the then King of Madurai, Muthuvijaranga Sokkanatha Nayak.

== Structure ==
The book manages to entertain as well as inform. Katiyankaran foretells the Thiruvala uprising of Courtallam. Thiruvala begins Three Tamils are strolling on Courtallam Nadar Road to chant the four verses. Women are getting up to see Courtallam Nadar Thiruvala. Vasanthavalli (storyteller) who was swinging the ball at that time is also coming to Thiruvalakkana. Vasanthavalli, who knows about the Lord through her friend, sends her friend in love with the Lord. In this case, the tagger is coming down the street. When the friend calls to tag her, the girl picks up on her native mountains and her career. Then Vasanthavalli looks at her hand and tells her the news of Courtallanadar's love and the (leader's) reputation of Courtalanathar. Her husband's leader is looking to see her. The two enjoy singing to the culprit to tell what happened to the leader who witnessed the crime. Thus ends the story

== Features ==
Kuravansi Kuravansi is one of the most acclaimed texts and is still performed on stage today as a dance drama. Although he wrote Talapuranam, Malai, Siladai, Pillai Tamil, Yamakaanthadi etc. on the Trikutarasapakkavirayar Courtallam, his Kuravanchi is the only one that many people like to read today. Kutralakkuravansi got the name Thirukkuralak kuravansi because it was sung against the Lord. Filled with drama, the book is full of melodic and imaginative songs.

== Period ==
One of the songs in the book states that Chinnanan Sathevan narrated the story of the death of the Pandya king Courtalanathar in the year 887 in Kollam. Kollam 824 + 887 = 1711. This book refers to the 18th century.
