= Aipasi =

- Native name: Aippasi
- Calendar: Tamil calendar
- Month number: 7
- Number of days: 29 or 30
- Season: Kulir (autumn)
- Gregorian equivalent: October–November
- Significant days: Deepavali

Aipasi is the seventh month of the Tamil calendar. The name of the month is derived from the position of the Moon near the Ashvini nakshatra (star) on the pournami (full moon) day. The month corresponds to kulir kaalam (autumn season) and falls in October–November in the Gregorian calendar.

In the Hindu lunar calendar, it corresponds to the seventh month of Ashvin, falling in the Gregorian months of September–October.

In the Hindu solar calendar, it corresponds to the seventh month of Tula and begins with the Sun's entry into Libra.

In the Vaishnav calendar, it corresponds to the seventh month of Padmanabha.

== Festivals ==
Deepavali is a Hindu festival of lights marking the victory of light over darkness, or good over evil. It is celebrated on the amavasya (new moon. It is dedicated to welcoming prosperity by worshipping goddess Lakshmi, the Hindu goddess of wealth. People light lamps (diyas), burst crackers, and do pujas.

== See also ==
- Astronomical basis of the Hindu calendar
- Hindu astronomy
