= Vaikasi Visakam =

Tamil Hindu festival

- Observed by: Tamil Hindus
- Type: Hindu
- Significance: Commemoration of Murugan's birth
- Celebrations: abhishekam, kavadi
- Observances: Puja in Murugan temples
- Date: Confluence of Visaka star in the month of Vaikasi
- 2024 date: 23 May
- 2025 date: 9 June
- Frequency: Annual

Vaikasi Visakam is a Tamil Hindu festival. It falls on the day the moon transits the Visaka nakshatram in Vaikasi (May-June), the second month of the Tamil Calendar. The festival is celebrated to commemorate the birth anniversary of Hindu god Murugan.

== Theology ==
According to the Kanda Puranam (the Tamil version of the Skanda Purana), three asuras (a race of celestial beings) Surapadman, Singamukhan and Tarakasuran performed austerities to propitiate the Hindu god Shiva. Shiva granted them various boons which gave them near-immortality and the ability to conquer the three worlds. They subsequently started a reign of tyranny and oppressed the living beings including the devas and other people. The devas pleaded Shiva for his assistance to put an end to the reign of Surapadman and the asuras. In response, Shiva manifested five additional heads and a divine spark emerged from each of the six heads. Initially, the wind-god Vayu carried the sparks, but the fire-god Agni took possession of them afterwards because of the unbearable heat. Agni deposited the sparks in the Ganga river. The water in the Ganga started evaporating due to intense heat, and so the goddess Ganga took them to the Saravana lake, where each of the sparks developed into a baby boy. The six boys were raised by handmaidens known as the Kṛttikās and they were later fused into one by Parvati, thus giving rise to the six-headed Murugan.

== Practices ==
On the day of the festival, special pujas and abhishekam are performed. Worshipers visit Murugan temples and chant mantras. People are offered Panchamirtham as prasad and sweets and other alms are donated to the poor. The god is taken on a procession in chariots or special mounts. Devotees of Murugan carry a kavadi, which itself is a physical burden as a fulfillment of vow made to the god.
