= Vel =

Divine spear in Hindu mythology

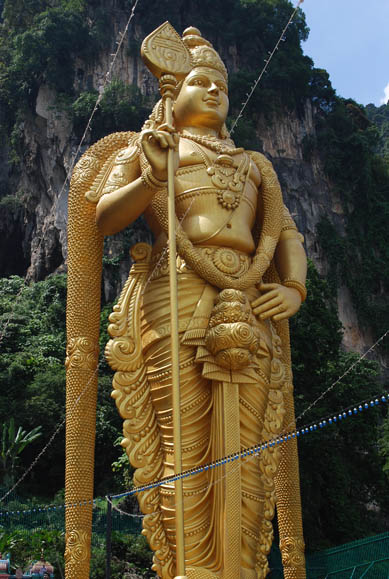
- Kartikeya statue with Vel at Batu Caves, Malaysia
- Type: Spear
- Place of origin: India

Service history
- Used by: Kartikeya

Production history
- Designer: Given to Kartikeya by Parvati (mother)

Vel (Tamil: வேல், lit. 'Vél') is a divine spear associated with Murugan, the Hindu god of war.

== Significance ==
According to Shaiva tradition, the goddess Parvati presented the Vel to her son Kartikeya (also known as Murugan), as an embodiment of her shakti, in order to vanquish the asura Surapadman. According to the Skanda Purana, in the war between Kartikeya and Surapadman, Kartikeya used the vel to defeat all the forces of Surapadman. When a complete defeat for Surapadman was imminent, the asura transformed himself into a huge mango tree to evade detection by Murugan. Not fooled by asura's trick, Murugan hurled his vel and split the mango tree into two halves, one becoming a rooster (Tamil: சேவல், lit. 'Séval'), and the other a peacock (Tamil: மயில், lit. 'Mayil'). Henceforth, the peacock became his vahana or mount, and the rooster became the emblem on his battle flag.

Vel, as a symbol of divinity, is an object of worship in the temples dedicated to Kartikeya. The annual Thaipusam festival celebrates the occasion when Kartikeya received the divine vel from his mother. During this festival, some of the devotees pierce their skin, tongue or cheeks with vel skewers while they undertake a procession towards the Kartikeya temple.

Adi-vel is a major festival observed in Sri Lanka by Tamil Hindus in July/August, known as Adi. The festival takes place in cities such as Katharagama and Colombo.

The alternative interpretation of vel is that it is a symbol of wisdom/knowledge. It symbolically shows that wisdom/knowledge should be sharp as in the vel's tip, as broad and tall as the javelin. Only such wisdom is supposed to be able to destroy the darkness of ignorance. The spear was regarded as a principal weapon of warfare, possibly because it was associated with Murugan, the favourite deity of the Tamils.

In ancient Tamilakam, the spear or lance (vēl) was a prominent weapon in Sangam literature. Jaroslav Vacek notes recurring descriptions of spears, including terms meaning “long spear,” “sharp spear,” and “victorious spear,” and records their association with kings and chieftains in Sangam poems.

== Gallery ==
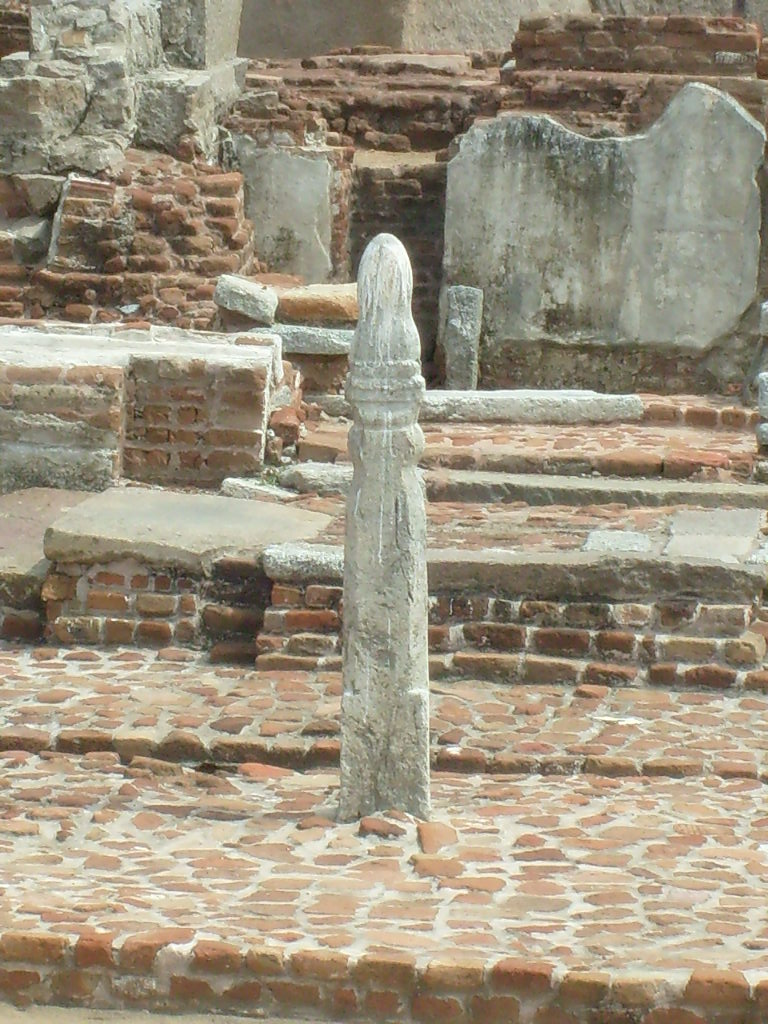
Stone vel from the Sangam period, Saluvankuppam, Tamil Nadu

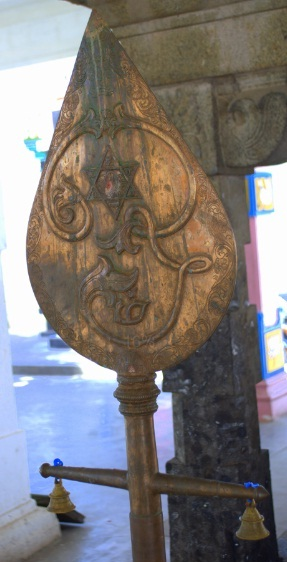
Vel, used to worship in the temple

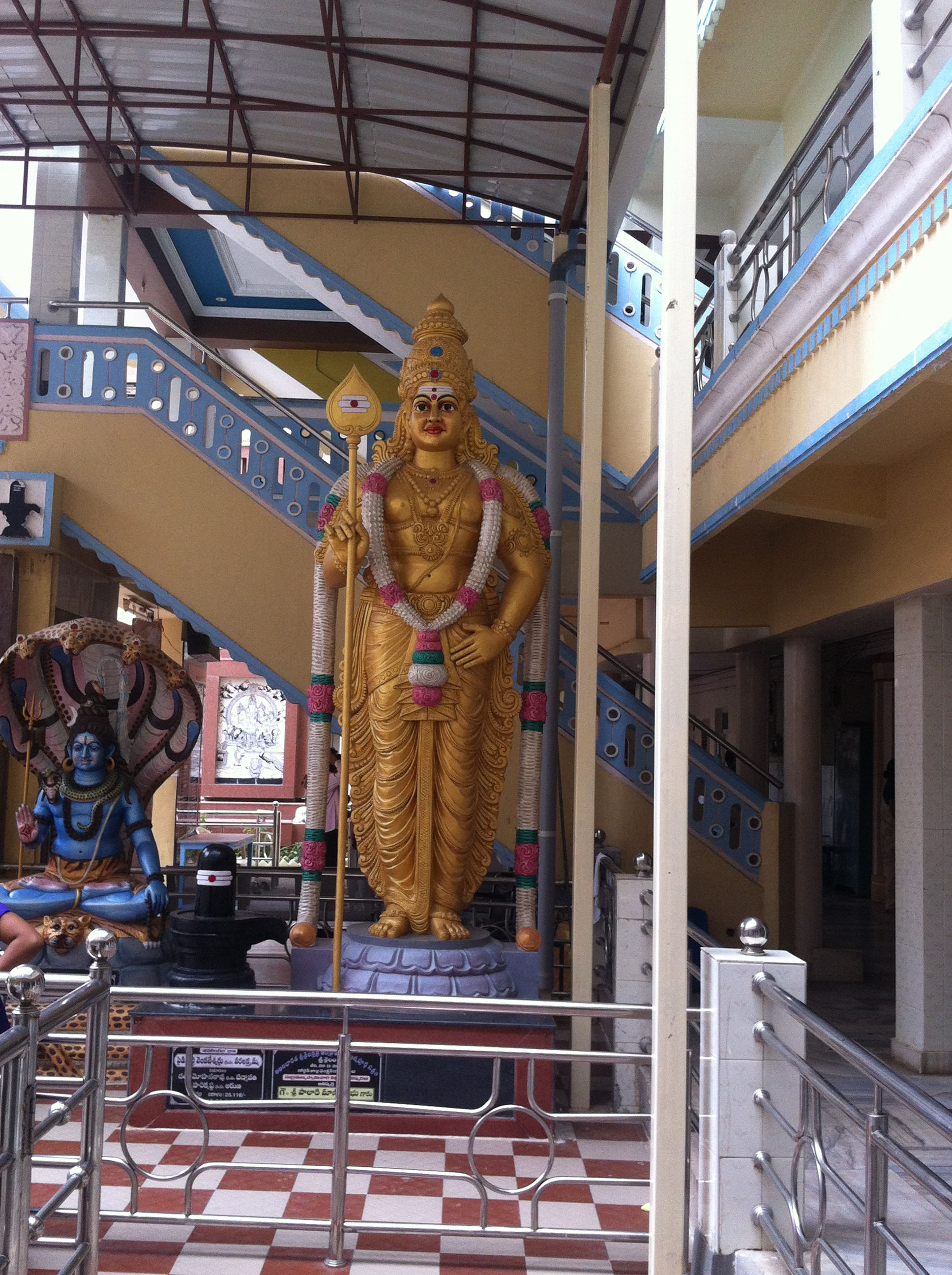
Statue of Murugan with Vel

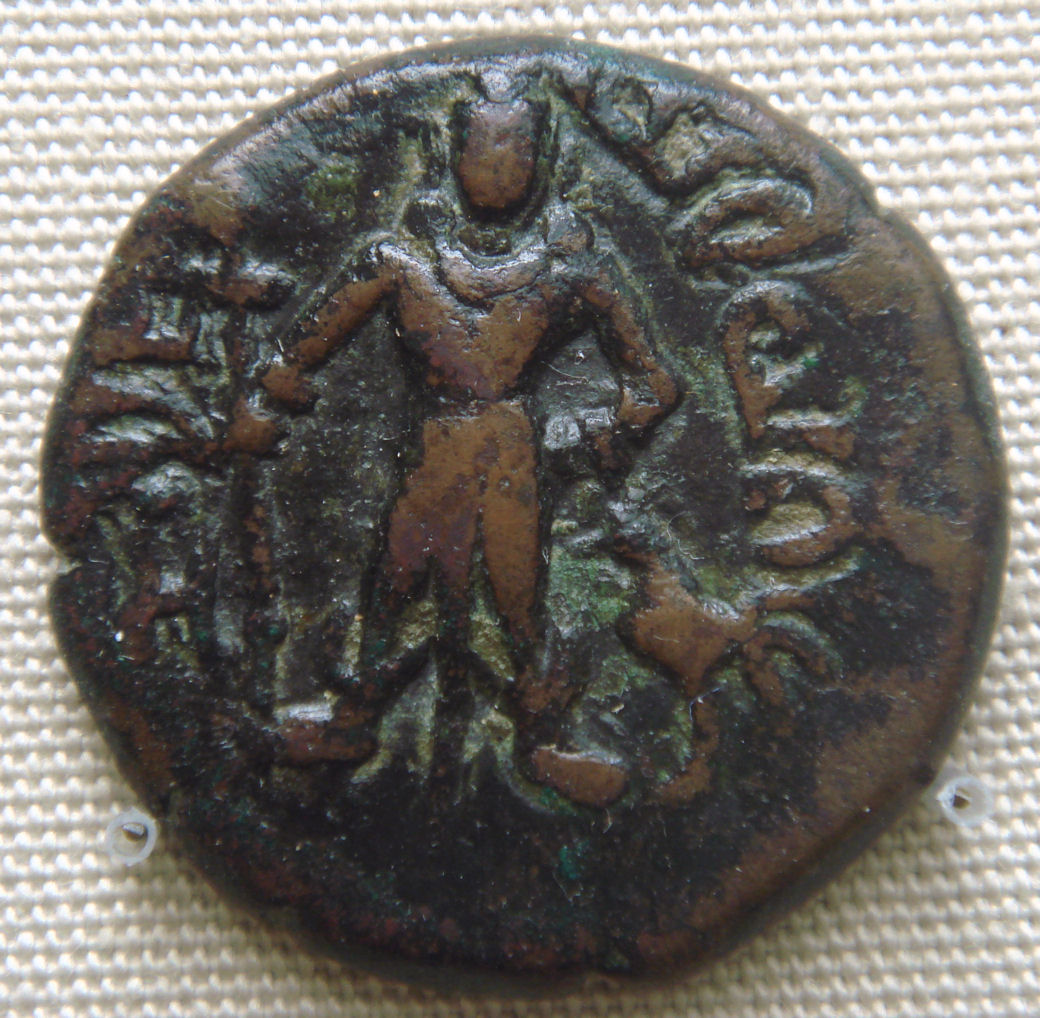
Coin of the Yaudheyas 200 BC, depicting Murugan with the Vel

== See also ==
- Trishula
- Kaumodaki
- Sudarshana Chakra
