= Śūrapadmā =

Asura in Hinduism

Surapadma
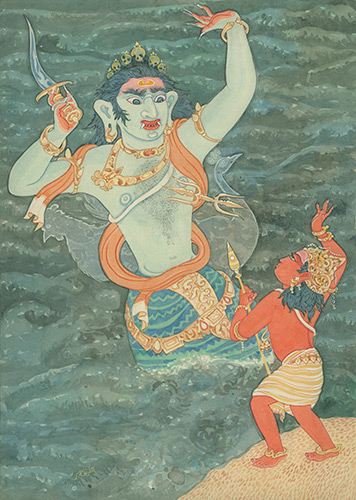
- Surapadma facing off with Kartikeya
- Texts: Skanda Purana

Genealogy
- Parents: Kashyapa (father), Maya (mother)
- Siblings: Tarakasura
- Spouse: Padmakomalai
- Children: Banukopan, Iraniyan, and others

Surapadma (Sanskrit: शूरपद्मा) or Surapadman is an asura featured in Hindu texts. He is the son of the sage Kashyapa and Maya. He waged a war against the devas and invaded Devaloka with a massive army. He was killed by Kartikeya. According to Tamil literature, he was split into two by Kartikeya's vel and each half transforming into a peacock and a rooster, which Kartikeyan took as his vahana and pennon respectively. The event is commemorated as Surasamharam.

== Legend ==
The Kanda Puranam, the Tamil rendition of the Skanda Purana, describes the legend of Surapadma. He is the son of the sage Kashyapa and the shakti Maya. The asura brothers Surapadma, Simhamukha, and Tarakasura performed tapas to Shiva, who granted them with various weapons and a wish wherein they could only be killed by the son of Shiva, which offered them near-immortality. Surapadama married Padmakomalai, with whom he sired several sons, the eldest of whom was Banukopan.

Surapadma ruled from his capital at Viramakendiram. He subsequently oppressed other celestial beings including the devas, and started a reign of tyranny in the three worlds. He also desired Indrani, the wife of Indra, the king of the devas. When the devas pleaded to Shiva for his assistance, divine sparks emerged from him, which later developed into Kartikeya. He invaded Devaloka with a massive army, and Indra fled to the earth. Kartikeya sent Viravakuteva as his messenger to urge Surapadma to cease his activities. However, Surapadma ignored the messages, which led to Kartikeya declaring a war on him.

Kartikeya led the army of the devas against Surapadma. He killed all of Surapadma's brothers and sons except Iraniyan. In the final battle at Tiruchendur, Surapadma took a large form with multiple heads, arms and legs trying to intimidate Kartikeya. When Kartikeya threw his vel, Surapadma escaped to the sea and took the form of a large mango tree, which spread across the three worlds. Kartikeya used his vel to split the tree in half, with each half transforming into a peacock and a rooster, respectively. After Surapadma was killed, Kartikeya took the peacock as his vahana and the rooster as his pennon. The killing of Surapadma by Kartikeya is described to mark the onset of the Kali Yuga. The event is commemorated as Surasamharam.

== See also ==
- Banasura – Hindu mythological character
- Jalandhara – Asura in Hinduism
