= Swaminatha Swamy Temple =

Murugan Temple in Thanjavur district, Tamil Nadu, India

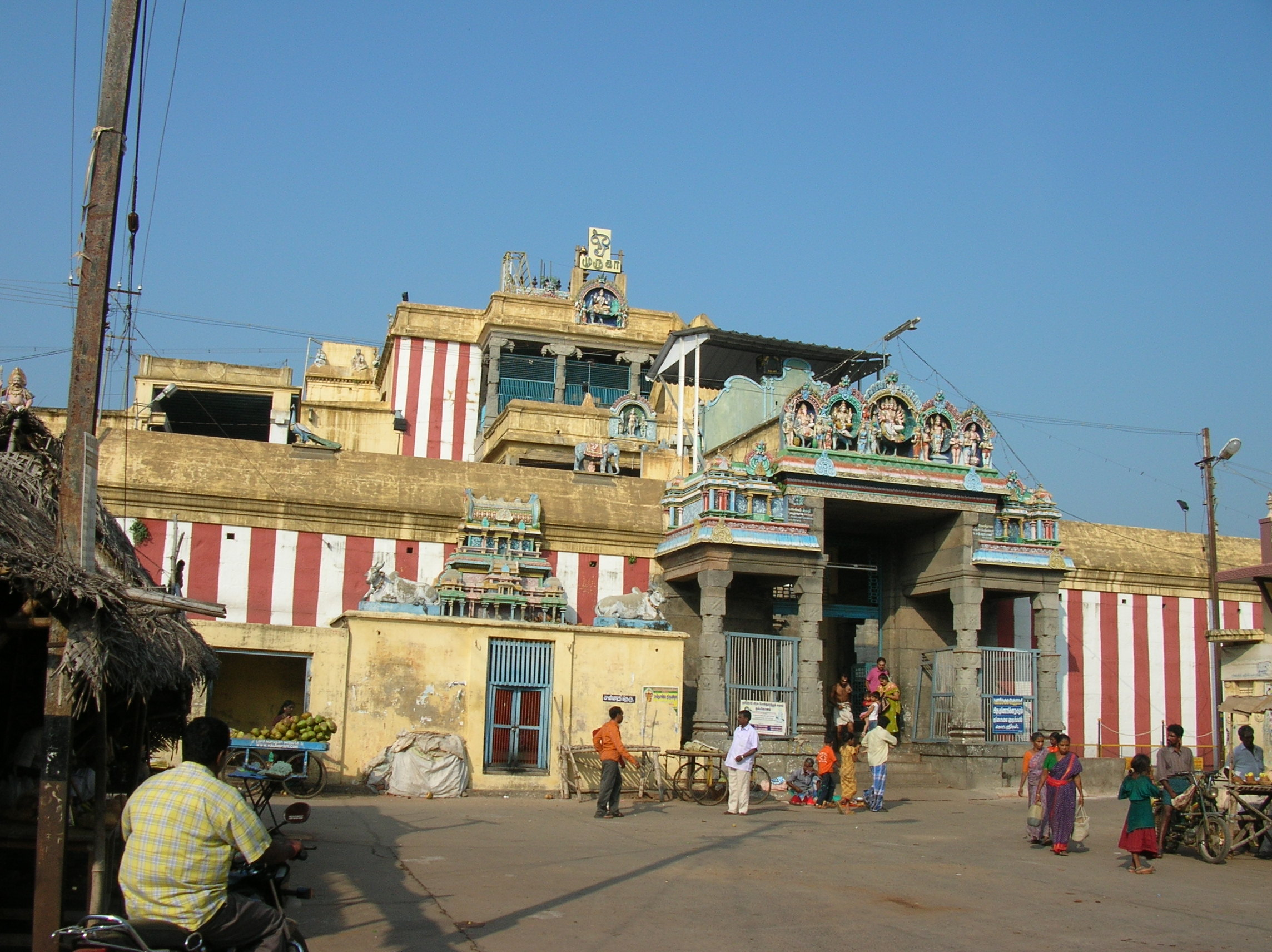
- Entrance to the temple

- Location in Tamil Nadu, India

Religion
- Affiliation: Hinduism
- District: Thanjavur
- Deity: Swaminatha (Murugan)
- Festival: Vaikasi Visakam

Location
- Location: Swamimalai
- State: Tamil Nadu
- Country: India
- Coordinates: 10.956844°N 79.325776°E

Architecture
- Type: Tamil

Swaminatha Swamy Temple is a Hindu temple dedicated to god Murugan. It is located on the banks of a tributary of river Kaveri in Swamimalai near Kumbakonam, Thanjavur district, Tamil Nadu, India. The temple is one of the Six Abodes of Murugan (Arupadaiveedugal). The temple is located atop a 60 ft (18 m)-high hillock with the shrines dedicated to Shiva (Sundareswarar) and Meenakshi (Parvati) is located at the foothill. The temple has three gopurams (gateway towers), and consists of three precincts. Sixty steps, each one named after the sixty Tamil years, lead atop the temple.

As per Hindu mythology, Murugan extolled the meaning of the Pranava Mantra (Om) to his father Shiva at this place and hence the deity is known by the name Swaminathaswamy. It is maintained and administered by the Hindu Religious and Charitable Endowments Department of the Government of Tamil Nadu. The temple has six daily rituals at various times and three yearly festivals on its calendar. The annual Vaikasi Visakam is the major festival in the temple.

== Mythology ==
As per Hindu mythology, a young Murugan asked Brahma, the Hindu god of creation, as to how he created living beings. Brahma said that he did so with the help of the Vedas, and recited the text beginning with the Pranava mantra (Om). When Murugan asked Brahma to explain the meaning of the mantra, Brahma had no answer, and hence Murugan imprisons Brahma. The devas requested Vishnu, and Shiva for help in negotiating with Murugan to release Brahma, and Shiva went to reason with Murugan. Shiva asked Murugan to release Brahma, and Murugan refused. When Shiva challenged Murugan to explain the meaning of the mantra, Murugan teaches it to his father. As Shiva was a student to a teacher (Murugan), Murugan is called "Swaminatha Swami" (Teacher of God). To signify this, the shrine of Murugan is atop the hillock, while Shiva's shrine is located at the basement at Swamimalai.

As per the Kanda Puranam, once all sages and gods assembled in Kailasa to witness the wedding of Shiva with Parvati, which resulted in the tilting of the Earth. Shiva asked the sage Agasthya to move towards the South to balance the tilt. Agastya employed Idumban to carry two hills in his shoulders to be placed in the South as a counter balance. Idumban carried the hills down south and Murugan made him place one of the hills at Palani. He carried the other hill to Swamimalai.

== Religious importance ==
Swamimalai is one of the Arupadaiveedu (six abodes), a set of Hindu temples dedicated to Murugan. According to Hindu mythology, Mahalingeswarar (Shiva) at Thiruvidaimarudur is surrounded by Saptavigraha Murtis (seven deities) located at various places, which include Murugan at Swamimalai. Brahma, Bhoomidevi, and Indra worshipped Murugan at Swamimalai. The temple is mentioned in the Sangam literature Tirumurukāṟṟuppaṭai by Nakkeerar. Arunagirinathar was a Tamil poet who lived in the 14 century CE. He composed Tamil hymns glorifying Murugan, the most notable being Tiruppukal, and included hymns about the temple.

== Architecture ==
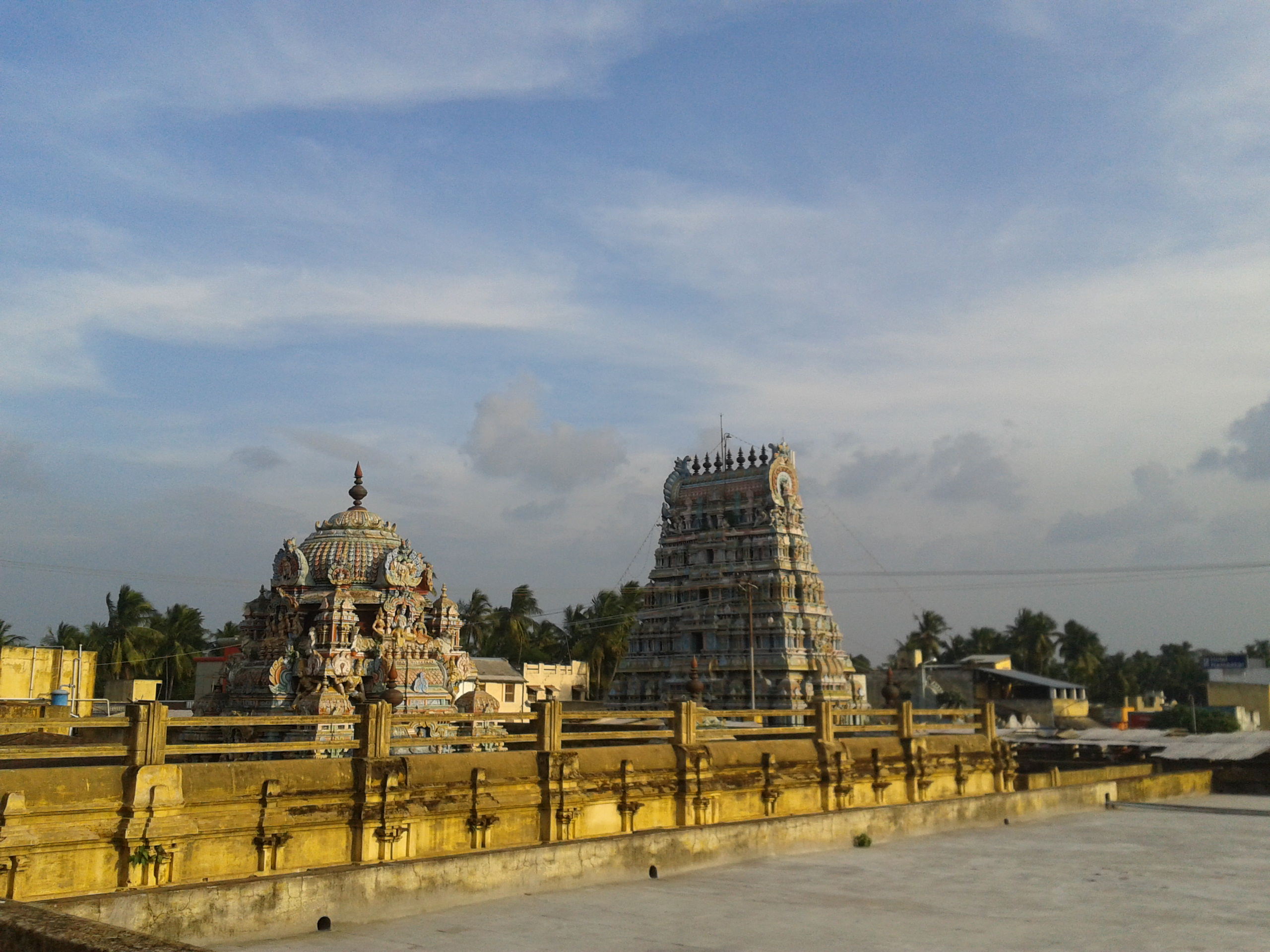
The vimanam (left) of the temple, along with the taller gopuram

The temple is located on a hillock at Swamimalai near Kumbakonam. The temple has three entrances, with a five storey gopuram on the south side. There are three precincts (praharams), the first praharam at the base of the hill, the second halfway up the hill and the third at the top encircling the garbagriha. There are shrines dedicated to other gods and goddesses across the temple. There are sixty steps that lead to the temple, which represent the sixty years of the Tamil calendar. In Swamimalai, Murugan is known as "Swaminatha Swami". The main idol is 6 ft (1.8 m) tall, holding a stick (danda) on the right hand.

Instead of the peacock mount (vahana) associated with Murugan, Murugan is depicted with an elephant mount at the temple. This iconography is maintained only in two places, Swamimalai and Tiruttani. The elephant was supposedly gifted by Indra, the king of the devas. While the mount is usually sported axial to the idol of the presiding deity, the elephant is seen in front of Murugan in the temple. The temple is maintained and administered by the Hindu Religious and Charitable Endowments Department of the Government of Tamil Nadu.

== Worship and practices ==
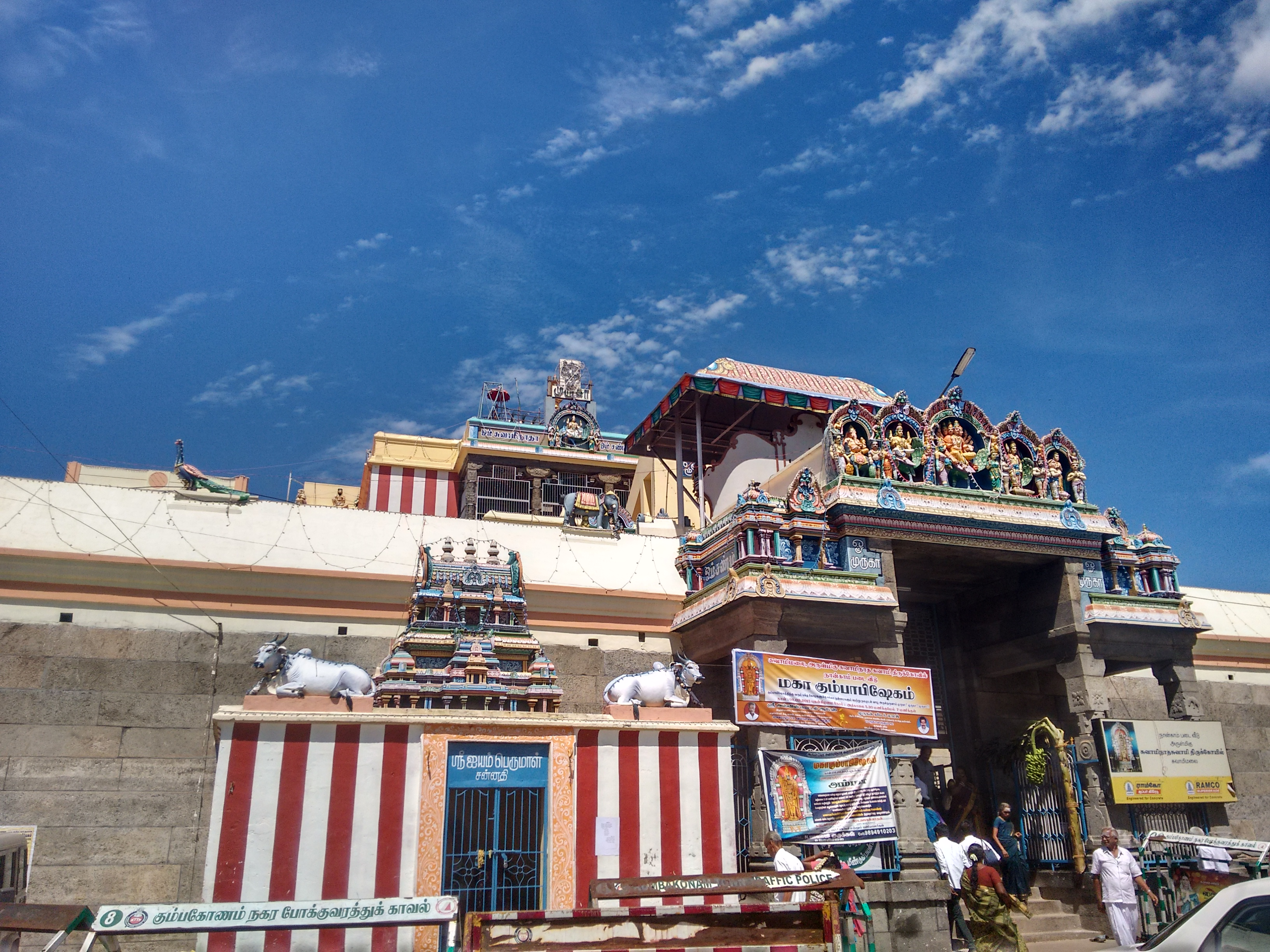
Second level of the temple

The major festival of the temple, Vaikasi Visakam, commemorates the birthday of Murugan, and is celebrated during the Tamil month of Vaikasi. As per Hindu mythology, Indra worshipped Murugan on the day. The Kumbhabhishekham of the temple was performed on 9 September 2015.
