= Murugan Temple, Pazhamudircholai =

Murugan Temple in Madurai district, Tamil Nadu, India

Solaimalai Murugan Temple
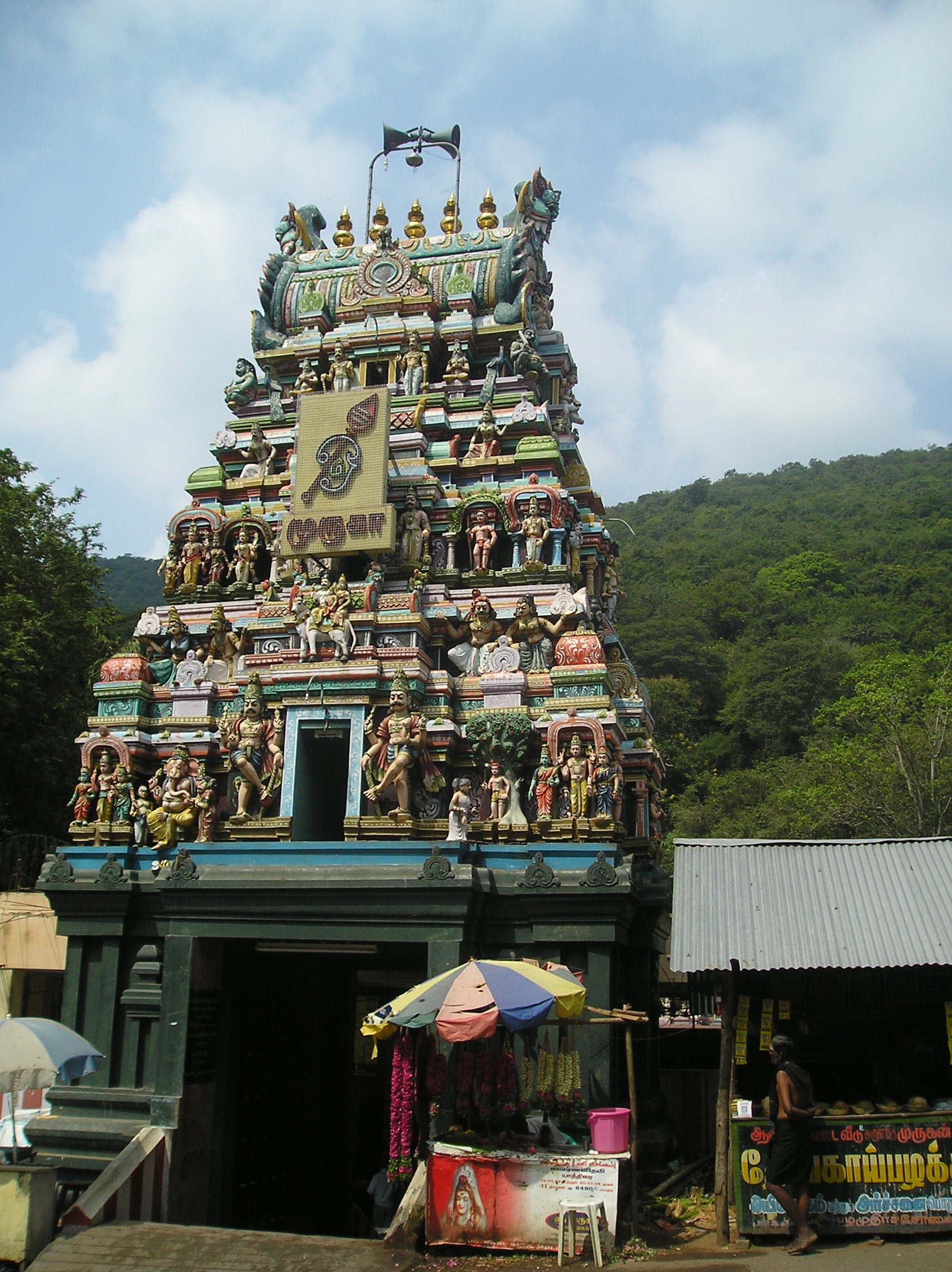
- Entrance to the temple

- Location in Tamil Nadu

Religion
- Affiliation: Hinduism
- District: Madurai
- Deity: Murugan

Location
- State: Tamil Nadu
- Country: India
- Interactive map of Solaimalai Murugan Temple
- Coordinates: 10.094069°N 78.223445°E

Architecture
- Type: Tamil architecture

Solaimalai Murugan Temple is a Hindu temple, located atop a hill, in the outskirts of Madurai in Tamil Nadu. It is dedicated to Murugan, and is one of the six abodes of Murugan (Arupadaiveedu). The temple is maintained and administered by the Hindu Religious and Charitable Endowments Department of the Government of Tamil Nadu.

== Mythology ==
As per Kanda Puranam, sage Narada once visited Shiva at Kailasha and presented him with a gnana-palam (fruit of knowledge). As Murugan felt cheated after the fruit was given to Ganesha, he left Kailasha to took up abode in the Palani Hills as a hermit.

After the incident, Tamil poet Avvaiyar came to pacify Murugan. Avvaiyar could not recognise Murugan, who was in disguise. Wanting to test Avvaiyar, Murugan, who was sitting atop a naaval tree, shook the tree to offer some fruits to the poet. Pazhamurdircholai is a combination of the Tamil language words, Pazham meaning fruit, udir meaning disperse, and cholai meaning orchard. As the fruits were dispersed at the location, it became the name of the temple.

== Religious significance ==
Earlier, only vel, the divine weapon of Murugan was worshiped in the temple. Later shrines dedicated to the deities Ganesha, and Murugan along with his consorts–Deivanai and Valli, were established.

The temple is mentioned in the Sangam literature Tirumurukāṟṟuppaṭai by Nakkeerar, and post Sangam literature such as Cilappatikaram by Ilango Adigal. Arunagirinathar composed Tamil hymns glorifying Murugan, the most notable being Tiruppukal, and included hymns about the temple.
