= Subramaniya Swamy Temple, Tiruttani =

Murugan Temple in Tiruvallur district, Tamil Nadu, India

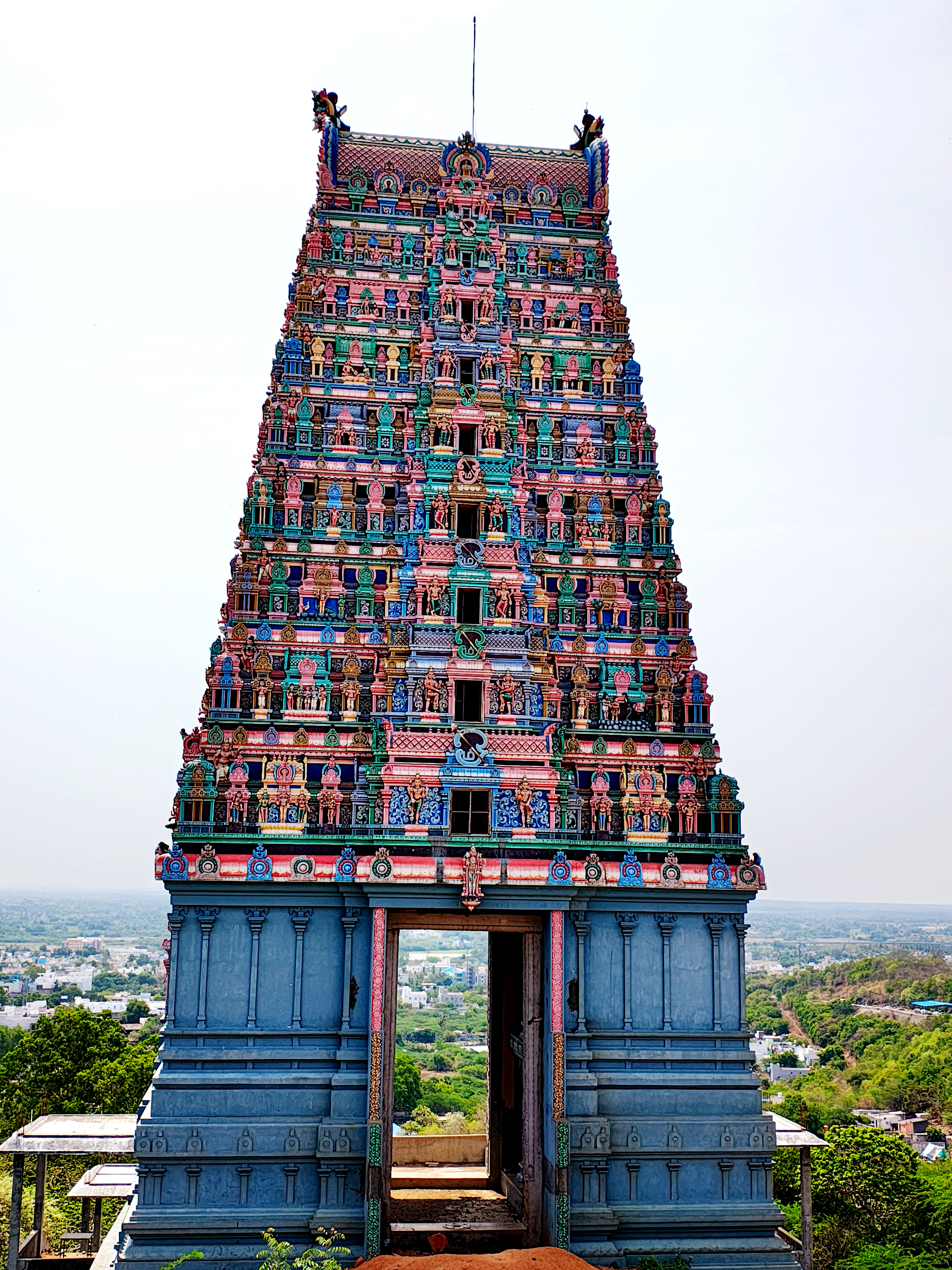
- Gopuram of the temple

- Subramaniya Swamy Temple, Tiruttani, Tamil Nadu

Religion
- Affiliation: Hinduism
- District: Thiruvallur
- Deity: Murugan

Location
- Location: Tiruttani
- State: Tamil Nadu
- Country: India
- Coordinates: 13°10′18.6″N 79°36′13.57″E

Architecture
- Type: Tamil architecture

Website
- www.tiruttanitemple.com

Subramaniya Swamy Temple is a Hindu temple located on a hillock in Tiruttani, Tiruvallur district, Tamil Nadu, India. It is dedicated to Murugan, and is one of the six abodes of Murugan (Arupadaiveedu). As per Hindu mythology, Murugan came to Tiruttani after killing Surapadman to subside his anger. He also married Valli at the location. In the temple, Murugan is seen holding a vajra vel (thunderbolt) instead of his normal weapon (vel), and has an elephant mount (vahana) instead of his usual peacock mount. The temple is maintained and administered by the Hindu Religious and Charitable Endowments Department of the Government of Tamil Nadu.

== Mythology ==
Hindu Texts Kanda Puranam and Kumarasambhavam recount a war fought by Murugan against the asuras. As Murugan was born to save the devas from the tyranny of the asuras, he was appointed as the commander of the devas and engaged in conflict with the asuras. Murugan killed Tarakasura and Simhamukha and faced off with Surapadman in the final battle in Tiruchendur. Murugan threw his vel, and killed Surapadman. After the battle, Murugan came to Tiruttani to cool himself. Tiruttani was derived from "Seruttani" in Tamil language, with "seru" meaning anger, and "thani" meaning sating.

After the war with the asuras, Indra also gifted Airavata, his white elephant, to Murugan for saving the Devas. However, the prosperity of devaloka began to wane as Airavata left. Indra prayed to Murugan to help with the same, and subsequently, the elephant turned towards east, facing the devaloka and restoring its prosperity.

As per Hindu mythology, Deivanai and Valli were forms of Amudavalli and Sundarvalli, daughters of Vishnu, and aspired to marry Murugan. Deivanai was brought up by Indra, the king of devas, and was married to Murugan at Thiruparankundram, after he killed Surapadman. Valli was brought up by Nambirajan, a tribal chief, after he found a baby amongst the plants. Murugan took the form of a hunter, to entice Valli, and later married her at Tiruttani.

== Religious significance ==
Tiruttani is one of the Arupadaiveedu (six abodes), a set of Hindu temples dedicated to Murugan. The temple is mentioned in the Sangam literature Tirumurukāṟṟuppaṭai by Nakkeerar. Arunagirinathar was a Tamil poet who lived in the 14 century CE. He composed Tamil hymns glorifying Murugan, the most notable being Tiruppukal, and included hymns about the temple. There is a statue of Arunagirinathar, in a seated form, in the temple.

== Architecture ==
The temple is atop on a hillock named Thanigai hill. There are 365 steps which represent the days of a normal calendar year. Kalhara Theertham, a water body supposedly created by Indra, is located atop the hill. The temple has a nine-tiered main gopuram and four precincts (praharas). The vimana above the garbagriha (sanctum) has six petals. Vinayaka is located in forefront, and is known as "Abath Sahaya Vinayaka", meaning protector from evil.

Murugan is represented in a standing pose with his left hand on his hip. He is seen holding a vajra vel (thunderbolt) in his right hand, instead of his usual weapon (vel). There is a scar on the chest, a remnant from his war with the asuras. There is an elephant mount (vahana) instead of his usual peacock mount. The elephant signifies Airavata, which was gifted to Murugan by Indra, and faces east, in a direction away from the main sanctum. This iconography is maintained only in two places, Swamimalai and Tiruttani. The temple has separate shrines for Deivanai and Valli. There are separate shrines for Durga, and Bhairava. Bhairava is represented holding four dogs, which represent the four Vedas.

== Practices and festivals ==
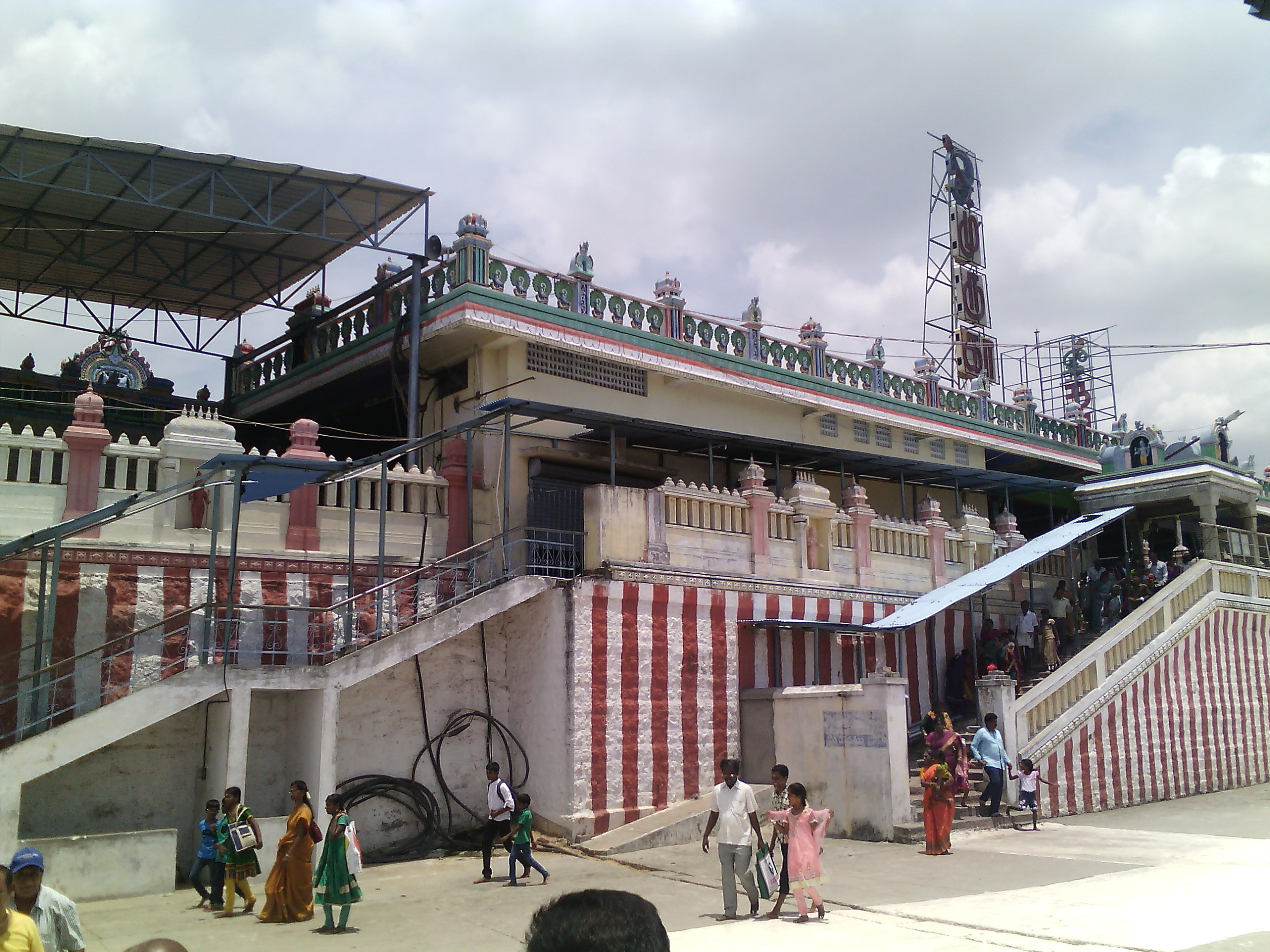
The main temple atop the hill

As Murugan came to Tiruttani to sate his anger after killing the asuras, the god is said to free one of anger and other evils. While Surasamharam, a festival to commemorate the killing of Surapadman, is widely celebrated across Murugan temples, it is not celebrated here. On the Surasamharam day, Murugan is showered with flowers, in a gesture to sate his anger. Like other Murugan temples, the worship practises include tonsuring in the temple, and offering of panchamirtham (a mixture of five ingredients) and milk. Carrying milk pots and Kavadi are other common forms of worship. A special sandalwood paste is applied on the deity during specific days. The paste is said to have medicinal benefits, and is later given as a prasadam.

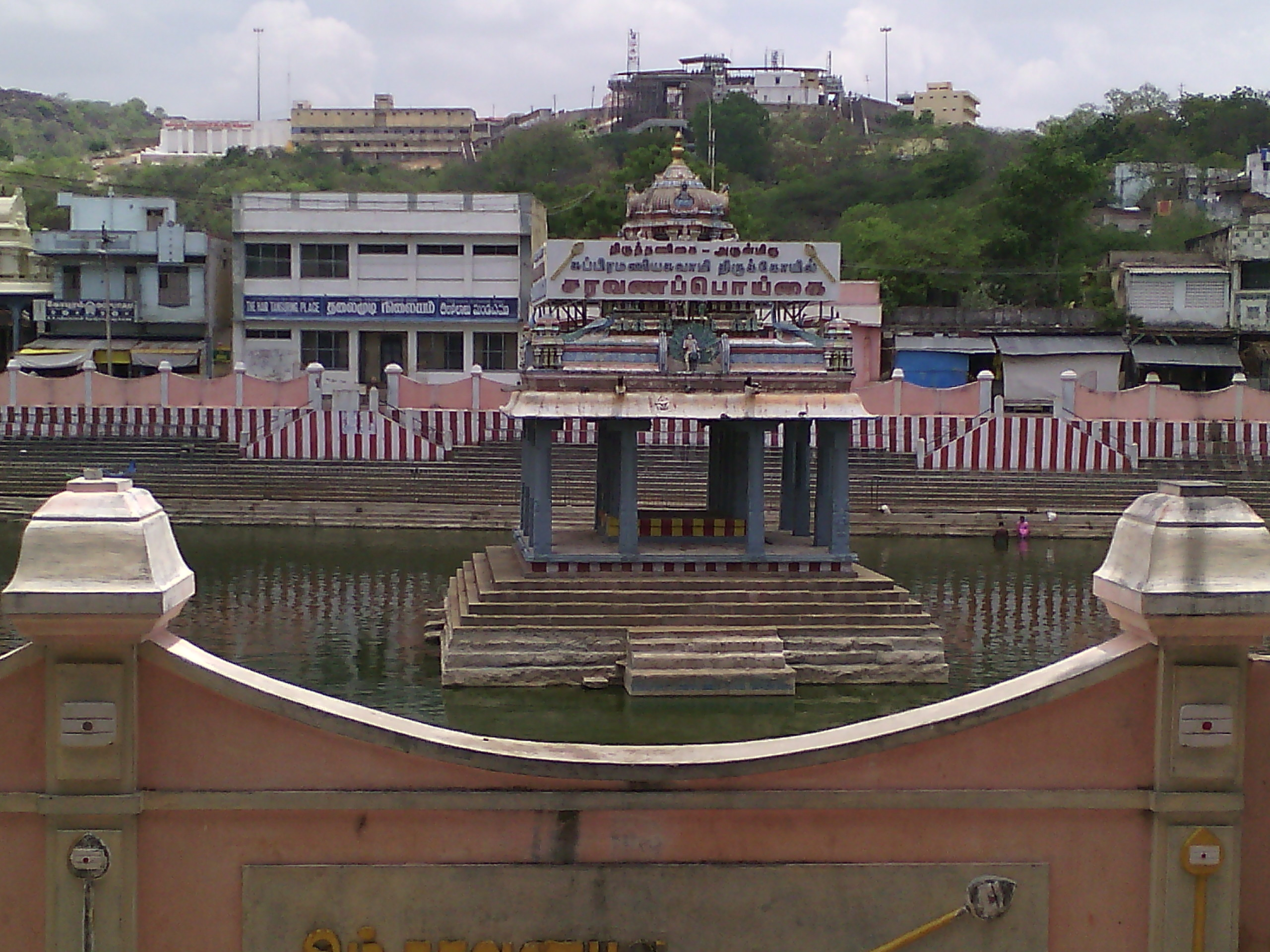
Sarvana pond at the foothill

There are few festivals and practices unique to the temple. A three-day festival is celebrated, beginning on the day when the Krittika nakshatra falls in the month of Aadi. Murugan is taken on a procession from the Sarvana pond in the foothills to atop the hill, and devotees carry kavadis decorated with flowers, as Indra was believed to have worshiped Murugan in this manner. In the month of Margazhi, Murugan is ritually bathed before his wedding to Valli. He is bathed in hot water, as it is believed that the cold water might cause inconvenience to the young Murugan during winter. The steps leading to the temple are washed, and turmeric is applied on them on the New year's eve, and a special puja is performed at 12 a.m. on the New year.

The occasion of Murugan's wedding with Deivanai is celebrated during the month of Chithirai. The annual Brahmotsvam and Murugan's wedding with Valli, is celebrated during the month of Masi. During the multi-day Brahmotsavam festival, Murugan is carried on various mounts on different days. He appears on tiger mount on the sixth day, signifying the disguise of the hunter he took to entice Valli. He appears on an elephant mount the next day, signifying his appearance during the marriage to Deivanai. On the final day of the festival, Murugan appears with Valli, and Deivanai.
