= Velladainatha Swami Temple =

Hindu temple in Tamil Nadu, India

Coordinates: 11.243736°N 79.780802°E

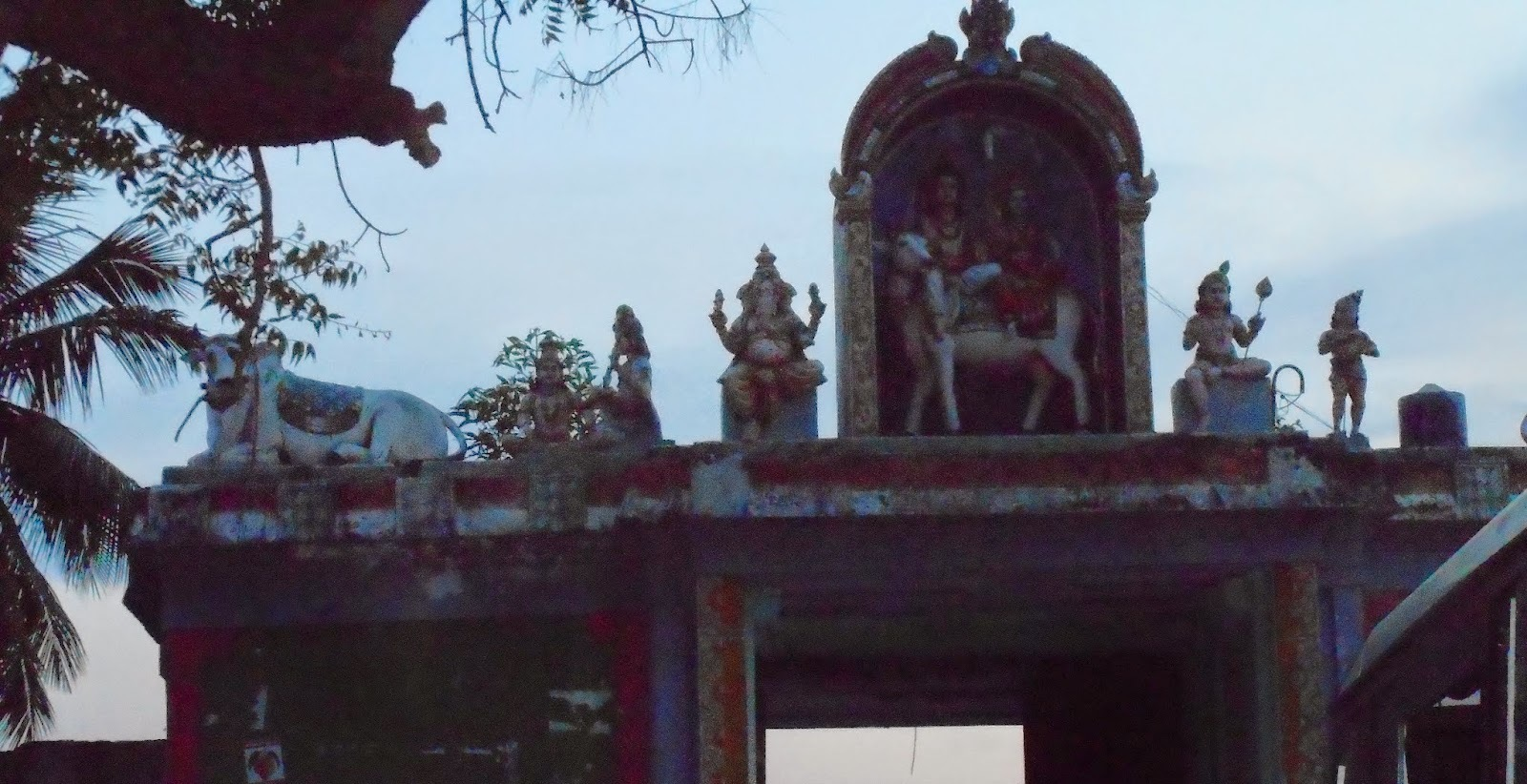
Temple entrance

Velladainatha Swami Temple is a Hindu temple situated in the village of Thirukkarukavur in the Mayiladuthurai district of Tamil Nadu, India.

== Legend ==
Thirukarugavur is believed to be the place when the Saivite saint Sundarar was purified of the sin of killing Jains who lost in debate with him. The temple tank in front of the temple is believed to turn white during new moon day of Tamil month of Thai (January - February).

== History ==
The temple contains seventeen inscriptions on its walls. The oldest are three inscriptions of Parakesarivarman, attributed to Uttama Chola, found on the south wall of the central shrine. An inscription from his 13th regnal year records the construction of the temple in stone, the appointment of nine persons to perform musical services during the Sri-bali ritual, the three daily worship sessions (sandhi), the ardhayama service and the palli-eluchi (morning awakening ceremony). It also records a land endowment made by Semban Arulan Uttama Nidhi, also known as Uttama Chola Muvendavelan, for the maintenance of these services (No. 434 of 1918).

Another inscription, dated to the fifth regnal year of Vikrama Chola, mentions a matha named Tiruchchirrambalamudaiyan and an assembly hall called Rajendra Chola Perambalam in Mummudi Chola Chaturvedimangalam, which was part of Rajadhiraja Valanadu.

== Architecture ==
The temple is an eka-tala structure. The garbhagriha measures 15 feet (4.6 m) square, with a central projection extending 6 feet (1.8 m) at each of its devakoshtas. The adhishthana is four feet (1.2 m) high, and its kumudam moulding is octagonal. A koshtapanchara is situated between the garbhagriha and the ardhamandapa, which extends 12 feet (3.7 m) eastward.

The devakoshta sculptures include Ganesha and Dakshinamurti on the southern side; Lingodbhava, accompanied by Brahma in human form, on the western side; and Brahma, eight-armed Durga, Vishnu and Mohini on the northern side. The temple also features a bhutagana frieze below the kodungai and a yali frieze above it. Two-armed dvarapalas flank the entrance to the mukhamandapa, and a subsidiary shrine dedicated to Ganesha is located nearby.

== Significance ==
It is one of the shrines of the 275 Paadal Petra Sthalams - Shiva Sthalams glorified in the early medieval Tevaram poems by Tamil Saivite Nayanar Tirugnanasambandar and Sundarar.

== Deities ==
The presiding deity of the temple is Velladainathar, also known as Tiruvelladai Isvara or Velvidai Isvara. Somaskandar is the processional deity (Utsavar), and the goddess is Kavianganni (also spelt Kaviyangkanni). The temple has shrines dedicated to Ganesha, Durga and Murugan, who is depicted with his consorts Valli and Deivayanai.
