= Ramalingaswami Temple =

Shiva temple in Tamil Nadu, India

Ramalingaswami Temple is a Hindu temple located at Papanasam in the Thanjavur district of Tamil Nadu, India. The temple is dedicated to Shiva.

== Mythology ==
According to Hindu mythology, Rama prayed to Shiva in order to be rid of the sin of killing Kara and Dooshna in the war against Ravana and installed 108 shivalingas in penance at the particular spot. While 107 shivalingas were made by him, the remaining one was brought from Varanasi by Hanuman.

== Significance ==
The shrine faces west in violation of the Hindu canon of temple architecture. The shivalingas, too, face west. There are shrines to Nandi, Kamadhenu, Murugan and his consorts Valli and Deivayanai, Shanisvara, Annapoorni and Kasi Visalakshi.
