= Saraswathi Nagar =

- Village
- Location in Tamil Nadu, India Saraswathi Nagar (India)
- Coordinates: 13.08°N 79.37°E
- Country: India
- State: Tamil Nadu
- District: Thiruvallore
- Elevation: 87.7 m (288 ft)

Languages
  - Official: Tamil
- Time zone: UTC+5:30 (IST)
- PIN: 631211
- Telephone code: 044

Saraswathi Nagar is a village under Karthikeyapuram panchayat, Tiruttani. The village has approximately 200 houses and it is largest village in Karthikeyapuram village panchayat. The nearest towns are Tiruttani and Arakkonam.

== Geography ==
Saraswathi Nagar is located at 13.08°N 79.37°E It has an average elevation of 87.7 metres (288 feet).

== History ==
The name "Saraswathi Nagar" originated from the Sree Saraswathi Mills Ltd business. Most of the adult inhabitants of Saraswathi Nagar are workers at the mill. People came from many places of Tamil Nadu, especially from Madurai, to work at the mill and settle in Saraswathi Nagar.

=== Saraswathi Nagar Plots ===
On 2010 Sree Saraswathi Mills sold its workers quarters and land property around the factory, to solve its financial problems. All residences in the quarters were moved to nearest villages. The quarters were demolished and the plots sold commercially to the public.

== Library ==
Saraswathi Nagar library was opened on 26 March 1969 by S. Madhavan. C. N. Annadurai was the Chief Minister at the time. This library is very active till now. It is the second largest library in Tiruttani, next to Tiruttani Library; an average of 127 people visit this library each day to read newspapers, books and magazines. At the end of 2010 it had 1,127 members.

== Post office ==
Saraswathi nagar village has post office. The post (mails) are also delivered to nearest villages P. T. Pudur and Valliyammapuram, post office also offers the following services:

- ePayment
- Instant Money Order Service (iMO)
- Postal Life Insurance
- Speed post service.

== Industry ==
- Sree Saraswathi Mill Pvt Ltd 'A' Unit
- MRF Limited, Itchiputhur, Arakkonam. Which is very near to Saraswathi nagar, some people of this Village work in MRF factory.

== Nearest Towns ==
- Tiruttani
- Arakkonam
