= Santhanathaswamy Temple, Pudukottai =

Hindu Temple

Santhanathaswamy Temple is a Hindu temple dedicated to the deity Shiva, located at Pudukkottai in Tamil Nadu, India.

== Presiding deity ==
The presiding deity in the garbhagriha, represented by the lingam, is known as Santhanathaswamy. The Goddess is known as Vedhanayagi. The presiding deity is facing east.

== Structure ==
In the prakara shrines of Dakshinamurthy, அண்ணாமலையார், Bramha, Surya, Chandra, Mahalakshmi, Saraswati, Vinayaka, Subramania with his consorts Valli and Deivanai, Sarabeswara, and Bairava, are found. The temple tirtta is known as Pallavan Kulam.

== Speciality ==
This temple was built by Kulottunga I who ruled during 1071-1123 CE. Just above the roof of the shrine of the presiding deity an inscription is found in which the temple is referred as Kulottungacholeesvaram. Later this temple was called as 'Sarndhorai Kattha Nayanar', the deity saves the devotee who depends upon the deity.

== Festivals ==
During Tamil month of Aani 10 day festival, Masi Maham, float festival are held in this temple. This temple is opened for worship from 6.00 a.m. to 12.00 a.m. and 4.30 p.m. to 9.00 p.m. During Tamil month of Aippasi, in Pournami, annabisegam (offering of food) and special worship are held.
