= Six Abodes of Murugan =

Six sacred temples of Hindu deity Murugan

- Āṟupaṭaīvīṭukaḷ
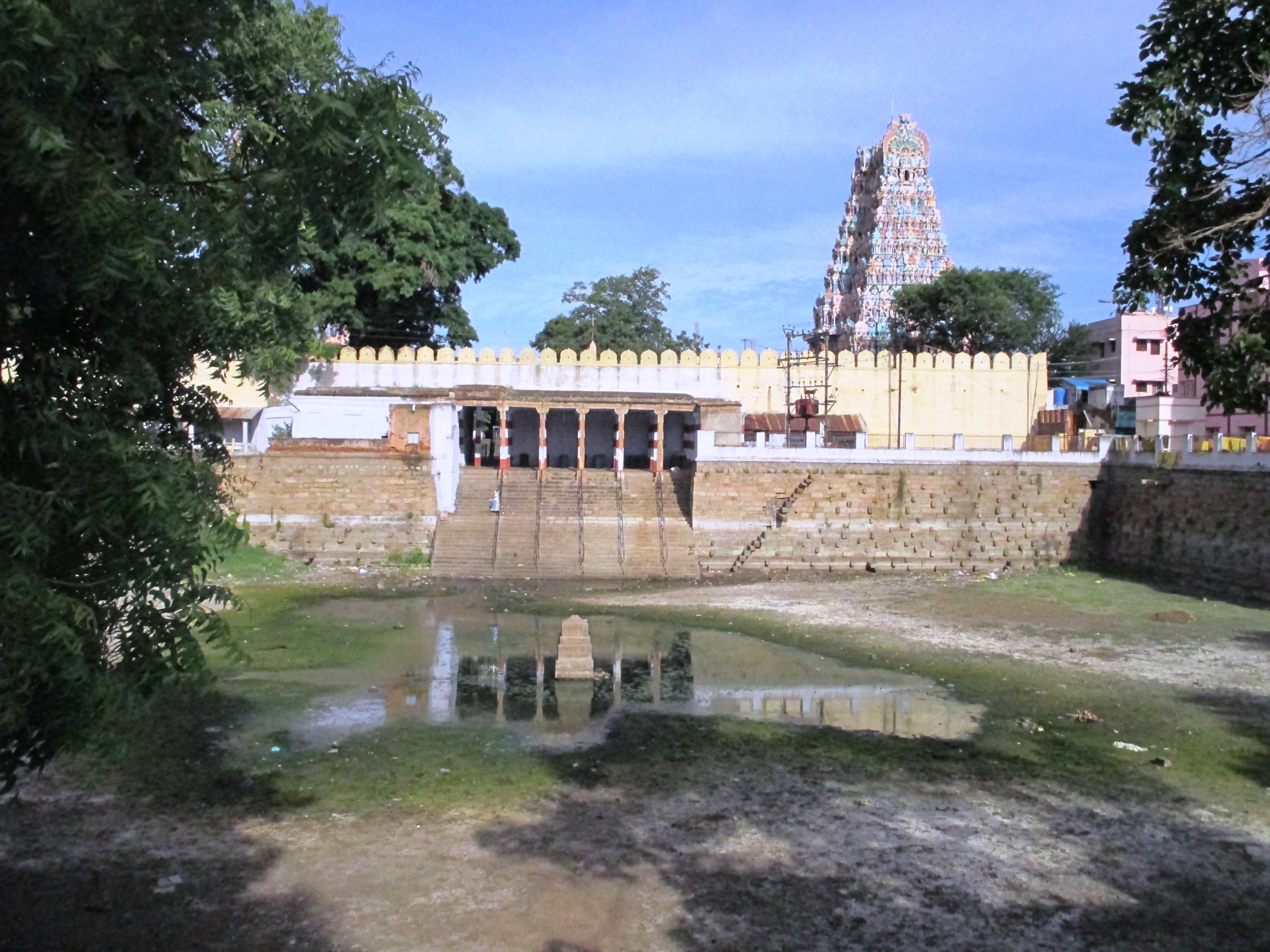
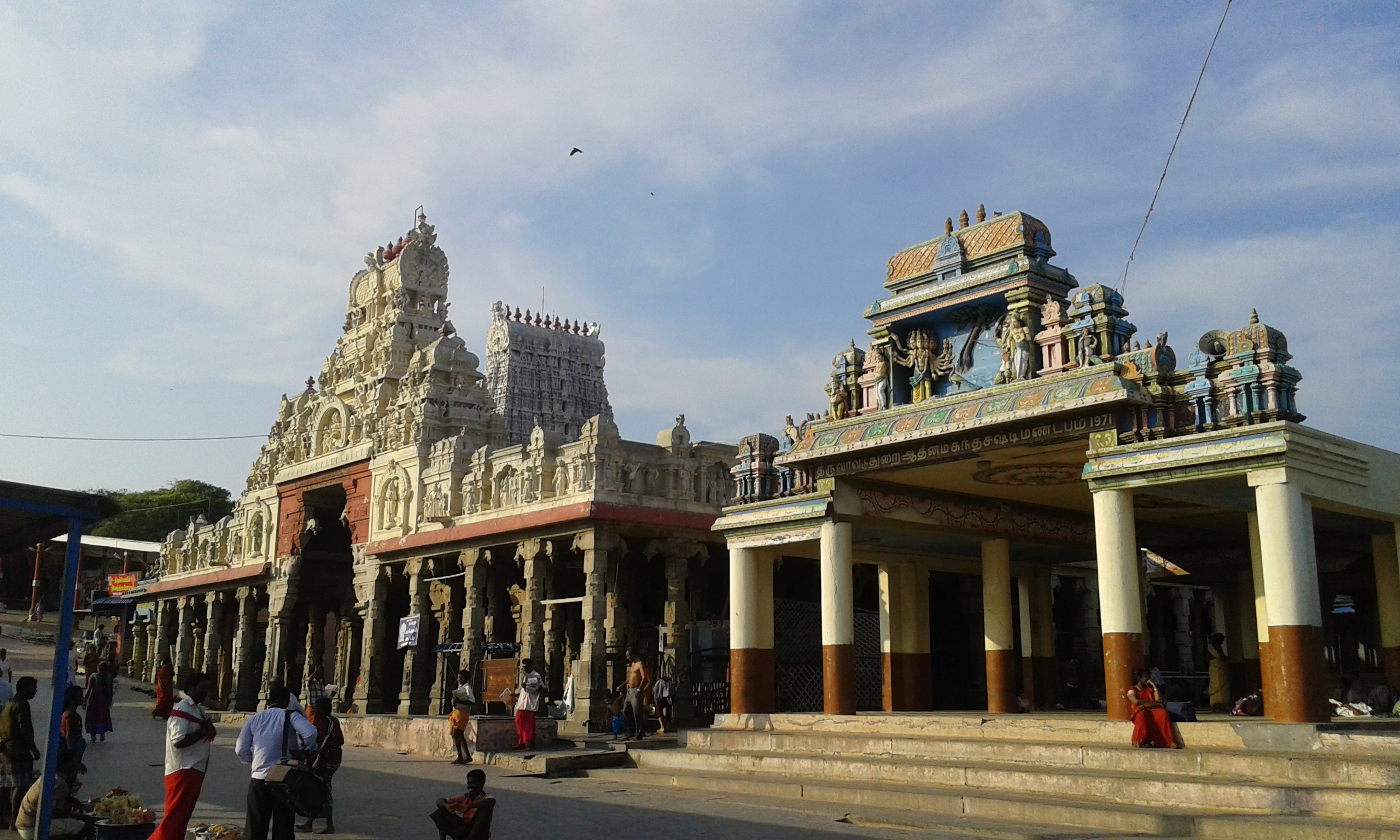
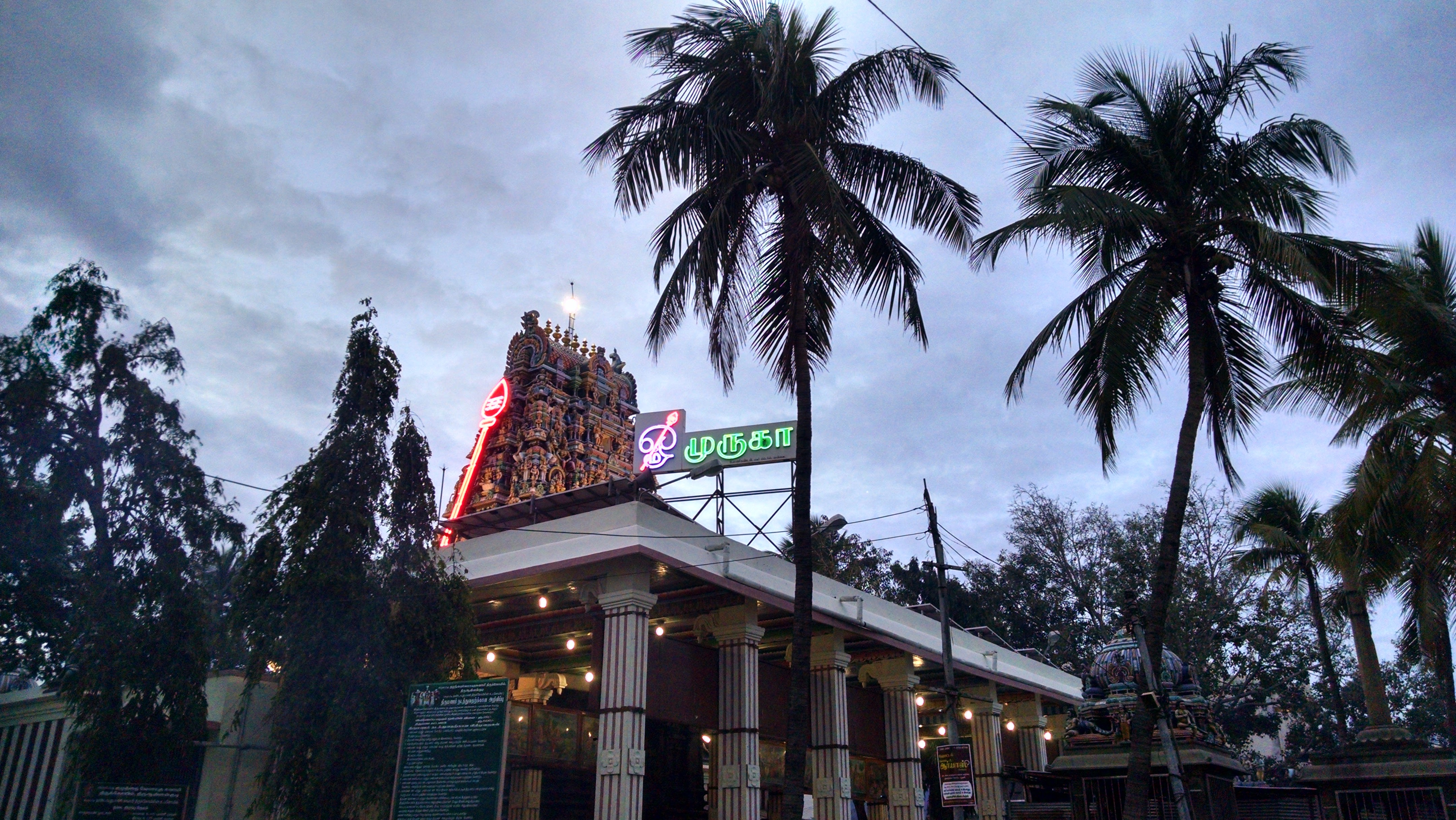
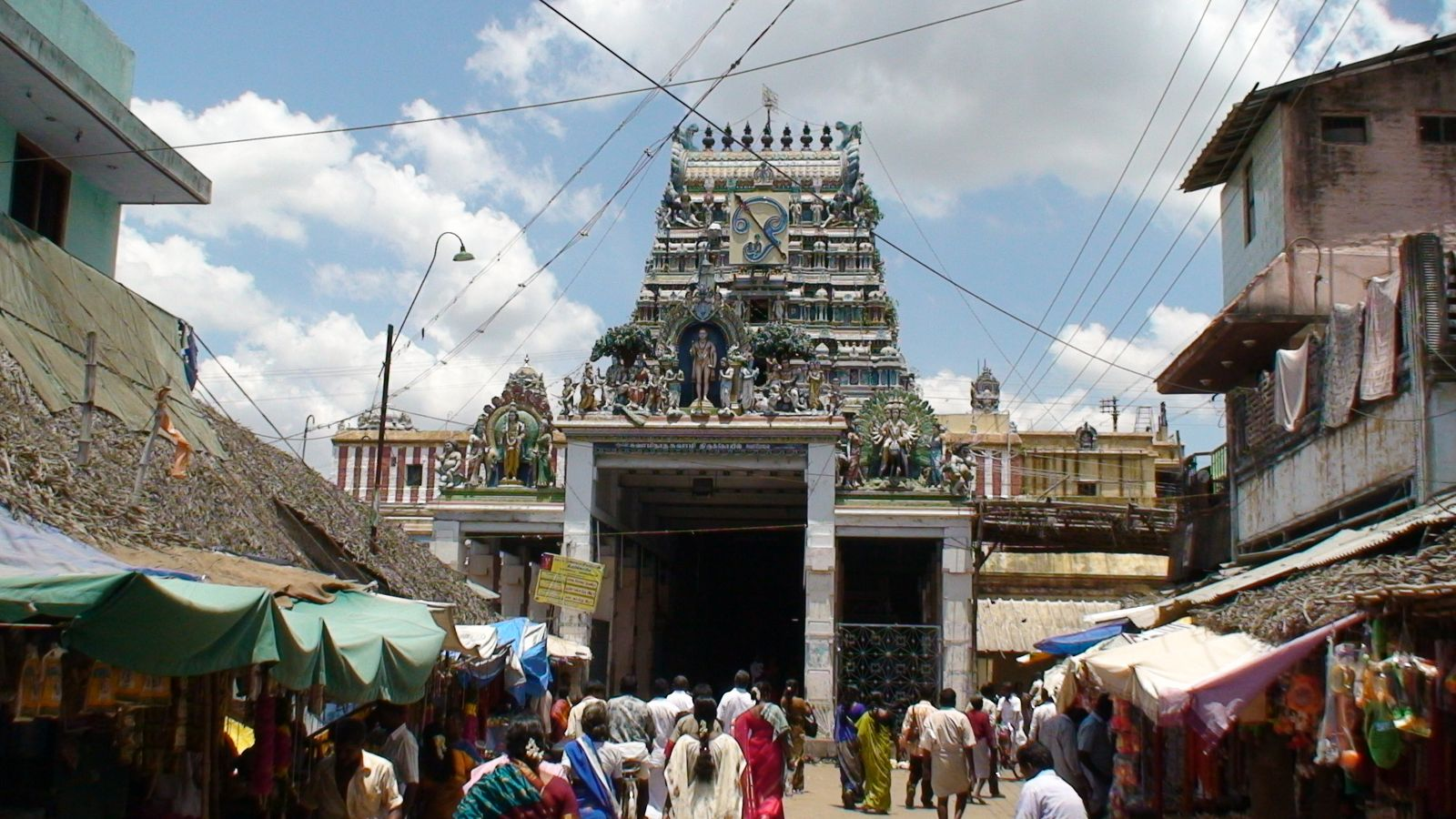
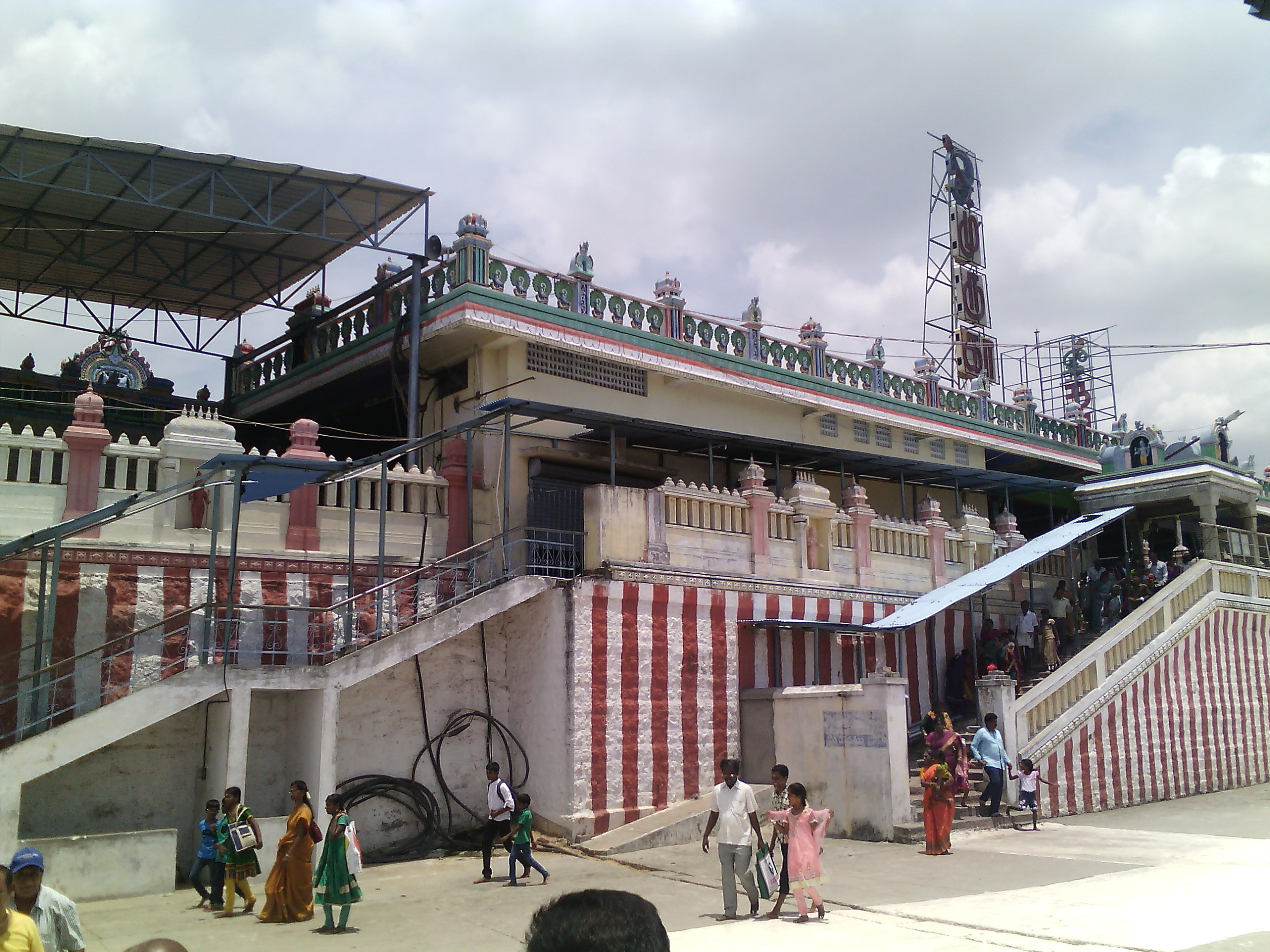
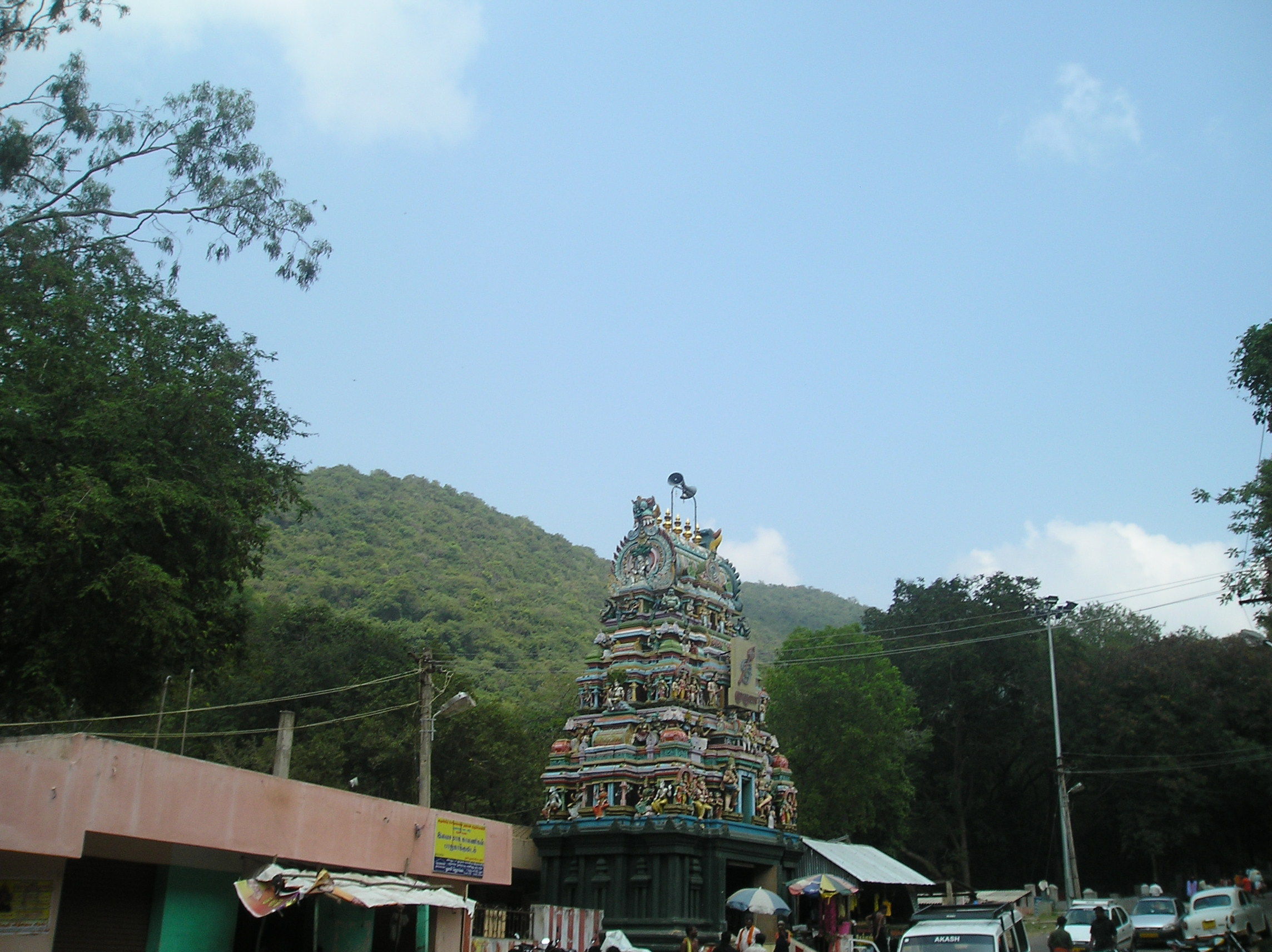
- Thiruparankundram Tiruchendur Palani Swamimalai Tiruttani Pazhamudircholai

Religion
- Affiliation: Hinduism
- Deity: Murugan
- Festivals: Karthikai Deepam, Panguni Uthiram, Surasamharam, Thaipusam, Vaikasi Visakam

Location
- Location: Thiruparankundram, Tiruchendur, Palani, Swamimalai, Tiruttani, Pazhamudircholai
- State: Tamil Nadu
- Country: India

Architecture
- Type: Tamil architecture
- Temple: 6

The Six Abodes of Murugan (Tamil: Āṟupaṭaīvīṭukaḷ) are six Hindu temples dedicated to the Hindu deity Murugan, located in Tamil Nadu, India. These are Thiruparankundram, Tiruchendur, Palani, Swamimalai, Tiruttani, and Pazhamudircholai. These temples, which are associated with Hindu mythology associated with Murugan, are associated with Tamil literature such as Tirumurukāṟṟuppaṭai by Nakkeerar, and in Tiruppukal by Arunagirinathar.

== Mythology ==
According to the seventeenth-century CE Tamil text Kanda Puranam, the asura brothers Surapadman, Simhamukhan, and Tarakasuran performed tapas to Shiva, who granted them with various weapons and a wish wherein they could only be killed by the son of Shiva, which offered them near-immortality. They subsequently oppressed other celestial beings including the devas, and started a reign of tyranny in the three worlds. When the devas pleaded to Shiva for his assistance, he manifested five additional heads on his body, and a divine spark emerged from each of them. The sparks were taken to the Saravana lake, where they developed into six baby boys. The six boys were then raised by the Krittikas and they were later fused into one by Parvati. Thus, the six-headed Murugan was born.

As per Kanda Puranam, Murugan imprisons Brahma as he could not explain the meaning of Aum. When Shiva asks for the meaning of the mantra, Murugan teaches it to his father. As per the same text, sage Narada once visited Shiva at Kailasha and presented him with a Gnana palam (fruit of knowledge), which is generally regarded as a mango. Shiva expressed his intention of dividing the fruit between his two sons, Vinayaga and Murugan, but Narada counseled that the fruit could not be divided. So, it was decided to award the fruit to whomsoever first circled the world thrice. Accepting the challenge, Murugan started his journey around the globe atop his peacock mount. However, Vinayaga surmised that the world was no more than his parents Shiva and Shakti combined, circumambulated them, and won the fruit. When Murugan returned, he was furious to learn that his efforts had been in vain, and felt cheated. He discarded all his material belongings and left Kailasha to take up abode in the Palani Hills as a hermit.

Shiva granted him celestial weapons and the divine spear vel, an embodiment of the power of Shakti (Parvati). On obtaining the vel, Murugan was imparted with the knowledge of distinguishing between good and evil. As Murugan was born to save the devas from the tyranny of the asuras, he was appointed as the commander of the devas and engaged in conflict with the asuras. He killed Tarakasuran, and Simhamukhan before facing off with Surapadma in the final battle at Tiruchendur. Surapadman escaped to the sea and took the form of a large mango tree, which spread across the three worlds. Murugan used his vel to split the tree in half, with each half transforming into a peacock and a rooster, respectively. After Surapadman was killed, Murugan took the peacock as his vahana and the rooster as his pennant. Murugan is married to Deivanai, the daughter of Indra, for his help in saving the devas from the asuras. He later married Valli, the daughter of a tribal chief.

In Tamil literature, five types of land are explained. According to these texts, Murugan is the deity of the mountainous Kurinji region. Extant Sangam literature works dated between the third century BCE and the fifth century CE mention Murugan "the favoured god of the Tamils."

== Temples ==
The six Hindu temples (Tamil: Āṟupaṭaīvīṭukaḷ) are Thiruparankundram, Tiruchendur, Palani, Swamimalai, Tiruttani, and Pazhamudircholai.Tirumurukāṟṟuppaṭai is a Sangam era text attributed to Nakkeerar, and was composed in Thiruparankundram. Tiruppukal, written by Arunagirinathar, consists of verses sung in praise of each of the temples.

Temple	Tamil Name	Location	Notes
Subramaniyaswamy Temple	தென்பரங்குன்றம் Teṉparaṅkuṉṟam	Thiruparankundram, Madurai district	Located on a hillock, it is the first of the Arupadaiveedu temples. Murugan's marriage with Deivanai took place here.
Subramanya Swami Temple	திருச்சீரலைவாய் Tiruccīralaivāy	Tiruchendur, Thoothukudi district	Located along the coast of the Laccadive Sea, the temple commemorates the place where Murugan won a victory over the demon Surapadman.
Dhandayuthapani Swamy Temple	திருவாவினன்குடி Tiruvāviṉaṉkuṭi	Palani, Dindigul district	Located at the foothills of a hillock, the deity known as 'Kulanthai Velayuthaswami' is depicted as a young form of Murugan, and said to have been worshipped by the goddess Lakshmi. In the temple on the hilltop where 'Dhandayuthapani' is the main deity, Murugan is depicted as a hermit carrying a staff ('danda'). This is the place where Murugan is said to have arrived after his feud with his family over a divine fruit.
Swaminatha Swamy Temple	திருவேரகம் Tiruvērakam	Swamimalai, Thanjavur district	Located atop a small hillock, the temple commemorates the incident where Murugan is regarded to have explained the essence of the Pranava mantra "Om" to his father Shiva.
Subramanyaswamy Temple	குன்றுதோறாடல் Kuṉṟutōṟāṭal	Tiruttani, Thiruvallur district	Located atop a hill, Murugan is said to have reclaimed his inner peace after winning a war over the Surapadman and married Valli here.
Solaimalai Murugan Temple	சோலைமலை Cōlaimalai	Pazhamudircholai, Madurai district	Located on a hillock near a stream called "Nupura Gangai", Murugan is seen here with both his consorts, Deivanai and Valli.

== Practices and festivals ==
One of the major traditions of the temples, is the tonsuring of devotees, who vow to discard their hair in imitation of the deity at Palani. Newborns may undergo a ritual of tonsuring and ear piercing at the temples. At Palani, the head of the presiding deity's idol is applied with sandalwood paste, at night, prior to the temple being closed for the day. The paste, upon being allowed to stay overnight, is said to acquire medicinal properties, and is much sought after and distributed to devotees, as rakkāla chandaṇam. Panchamritam is a sacred sweet mixture made of banana, honey, ghee, jaggery and cardamom along with date fruits and Sugar candies, which is offered to Murugan. Worship practices involve devotees wearing ochre clothes and carrying a kavadi, a mount decked with flowers, and tinsel work, on foot for long distances.

Various festivals related to Murugan are celebrated in the temples. Vaikasi Visakam marks the birthday of Murugan. Surasamharam commemorates the victory of Murugan over the asura Surapadman. Thaipusam is a major festival celebrated during the Tamil calendar month of Thai. Other festivals include Karthika Deepam, and Panguni Uthiram.
