= Senthilkumar =

Sendhilkumaran is a South Asian given name used in South Asia, Southeast Asia, and Arab states of the Persian Gulf.

== The deity ==
Senthil is believed to be from Senthur. One of the six abodes of Lord Muruga is Thiruchendur where The Lord is believed to have fought the battle with the Asura King Surapadman. Originally the place is called Senthur. Since it acquired the divine significance by being the battleground for Lord Muruga, the honorary prefix 'thiru' was added to it resulting in the name Thiruchendur. The deity from Senthur is called Senthil. It also means 'beautiful' But not Senthil guru. Many ancient texts decode the word 'Senthil' to be 'The Red One' which implies, 'The Formidable one'.

Lord Muruga is son of Lord Shiva, brother of Lord Ganesha. Senthil is another name for Lord Muruga; he has many names and many abodes. Kumaran means prince.

Senthil means Lord Murugan Name, Murugan means Beauty

== Use as a name for individuals ==
Senthil Kumaran, with variants Senthil, Sentil, Senthil Velan, Senthil Nathan, and Senthil Kumar, is used as a first name and surname by people of Dravidian descent, including Sri Lankan, Malaysian, Singaporean, Vietnamese, and Indian Tamils; Kannadigas; and Malayalis. It is also used by Hindu and Muslim communities in Southwest Asia. Senthil is derived from the word senthur. Senthil Kumaran means a beautiful prince.

== See also ==
Arupadaiveedu: The six major abodes of Lord Muruga
