= Tiruvattatthurai Theerthapurisvarar Temple =

Coordinates: 11.3817°N 79.1905°E

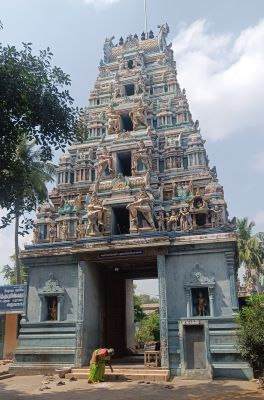

Tiruvattatthurai Theerthapurisvarar Temple is a Shiva temple, located in Tiruvattatthurai (also known as Tirunelvayil Arattjurai, Tiruvaratthurai and Tiruvatturai), a village in Cuddalore district, Tamil Nadu, India. The presiding deity is revered in the seventh-century Tamil Saiva canonical work, the Tevaram, written by Tamil saint poets known as the Nayanars and classified as Paadal Petra Sthalam.

== Location ==
This place is located along the Thozhudur-Vridhachalam bus route, around 20 km (12 mi) from Thozhudur.

== Presiding deity ==
The presiding deity represented by the lingam is known as Aratturainathar, Anandeeswarar and Theerthapurisvarar. His consort is known as Anandanayagi, Tirupurasundari and Arattthurai Nayaki. Sambandar, Appar, Sundarar, Nambiyandar Nambi, Sekkizhar, Valmiki and Aravan worshipped the deity of the temple.

== Festivals ==
Festivals such as Maha Sivaratri, Margazhi Tiruvadhirai, and Panguni Uthiram are held during February-March, December-January, and March-April respectively.
