= Murugan Devotees Conference =

Religious conference in Madurai district, Tamil Nadu, India

- Date: 22 June 2025
- Venue: Amma Thidal, near Toll Plaza
- Location: Vandiyur, Madurai, Tamil Nadu; 9.9195°N 78.1672°E

Murugan Devotees Conference is a religious event, to spread globally the principles and teachings of Murugan, held on 22 June 2025, in Vandiyur in Madurai district, Tamil Nadu in India. It was conducted at Amma Thidal near Vandiyur Toll Plaza. An expo is arranged in the venue of the conference, to display the temporary miniatures of the six abodes of Murugan.

The prototypes of the Six Abodes of Lord Murugan (Arupadai Vedu) of was displayed at the conference. Murugan represents the essence of Tamil culture, Bharat, and Bhartiya identity, Governor R N Ravi said on Saturday after visiting the venue. As per the latest reports, many devotees reached there via bus, train bookings, motorcycle, or on foot and reached the glory spot from all the districts of the states.

== Objectives ==
The objective of the conference is to unite the devotees and thinkers of Lord Murugan globally and the conference is organised by Rashtriya Swayamsevak Sangh affiliated Hindu Munnani.

Five lakh devotees of Lord Murugan are expected to assemble during the conference.
