= Karthikeyapuram =

Karthikeyapuram is one of 27 Gram panchayat in Thiruttani Taluka, Thiruvallur district, Tamil Nadu. It is an administrative panchyat for villages under Karthikeyapuram panchayat. The village is located 3 km from Tiruttani and 9 km from Arrakonam

== Villages ==
Villages under Karthikeyapuram panchayat Karthikeyapuram

- P.T Pudhur
- Saraswathi nagar
- Valliyammapuram
