= Panguni Uthiram =

Tamil Hindu observance of the full moon of Panguni month

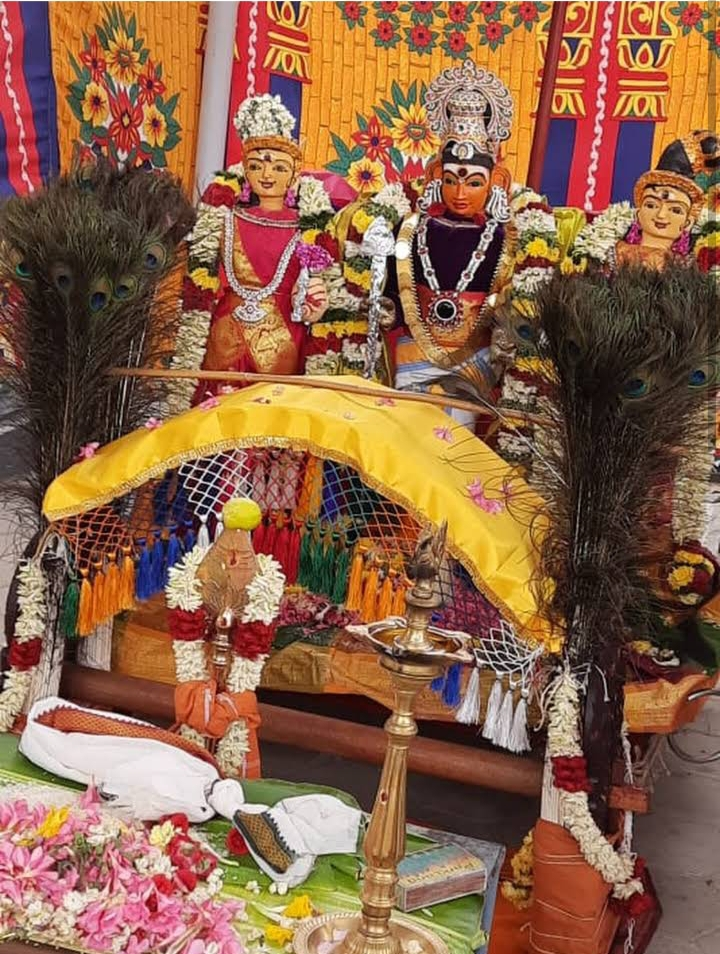
- Images of Murugan (centre) and his consorts, Deivanai and Valli, venerated on this occasion
- Observed by: Hindu Tamils
- Type: Hindu
- Significance: Commemoration of the weddings of Shiva and Parvati, Rama and Sita, Murugan and Deivanai, Ranganatha and Andal; Manifestation of Ayyappan
- Celebrations: Car festival, Kavadi Attam
- Observances: Puja in Vaishnava and Shaiva temples Festival of the 63 Saints (Nayanars)
- Date: Full moon day of the month of Panguni
- Frequency: Annual

Panguni Uthiram (Tamil: Paṅkuṉi Uttiram) is a Tamil Hindu festival. It is celebrated on the confluence of Uttiram nakshatram on the purnima (full moon) of the month of Panguni (March–April).

== Significance ==
Panguni Uthiram commemorates the weddings of Shiva and Parvati, Rama and Sita, Murugan (Kartikeya) and Devasena, and Ranganatha (Vishnu) and Andal. It is also marks the manifestation of Ayyappan.

Lakshmi is said to have emerged from the Ocean of Milk during the legend of the Samudra Manthana on this occasion, celebrated as Mahalakshmi Jayanti.

The day is intended to underline the glory of grahasta dharma (the married life of a householder).

== Religious practices ==
Devotees of Murugan carry a kavadi for the fulfillment of vows, marked in Murugan temples.

The Brahmanda Purana indicates that on Panguni Uthiram, millions of devas bathe in the Tumburu Tirtha, one of seven sacred tanks in the Venkateshvara Temple of Tirupati. Bathing in the temple tank during this occasion is said to release one from the cycle of rebirth.

The day is of special significance to the worship of the prithvi lingam, the lingam the earth element, of the Ekambareswarar Temple at Kanchipuram, Tamil Nadu, where festivities last for 13 days.

According to regional tradition, Parvati in the form of Gauri married Shiva in Kanchipuram. Hence, this day is also celebrated as Gauri Kalyanam.
