= Tiruppukal =

Anthology of Tamil religious songs

The Tiruppukal (Tamil: திருப்புகழ், Tiruppukal, IPA/Tamil: [tiɾupːuɡaɻ], meaning 'Holy Praise' or 'Divine Glory'), sometimes spelled Tiruppugazh, is a 14th-century anthology of Tamil religious songs dedicated to Murugan (Kartikeya), the son of Shiva, written by the poet-saint Arunagirinathar (Tamil: அருணகிரிநாதர், Aruṇakirinātar, [aɾuɳaɡiɾɯn̪aːdaɾ]). The anthology is considered one of the central works of medieval Tamil literature, both for its poetical and musical qualities, and for its religious, moral and philosophical content.

Tiruppukal - Umbartharu

== Description ==
There are no historical records of the life of Arunagirinathar, and what we know of the composition of the Tiruppukal is largely derived from oral traditions and legends recorded in commentaries on the work. According to these, Arunagirinathar led a hedonistic life as a young man. His disgust at his own conduct led him to attempt suicide by jumping off the temple tower at Tiruvannamalai. He was saved by Murugan himself. Arunagirinathar was transformed, and began a long pilgrimage, visiting the Arupadai Veedu (Six Abodes of Murugan), the six temples most sacred to Murugan, and over 200 other holy shrines in India and Sri Lanka. At each of these, he composed songs in praise of Murugan, which are collected together in the Tiruppukal. The majority of the songs are sung to Murugan, but there are also a few songs that sing of deeds of Shiva or the avatars of Vishnu, and of the power of Parvati. Almost all songs end addressing Murugan as Perumal, a term that traditionally had strong associations with Tamil Vaishnavism. However the literal meaning in Tamil of the word Perumal is "Great God" or "Great Man".

The worship of Murugan has strong roots in Tamil Nadu. According to Tamil legends, Murugan was the brave warrior who defeated the powerful demon Surapadman, and was seen as being the epitome of youth, compassion and beauty. Arunagirinathar's songs build on this tradition, hailing Murugan as the source of all knowledge, who even gave saintly advice to his father, Shiva. Murugan is described as being full of love and compassion. Arunagirinathar says in the Tiruppukal the songs will, by the grace of Murugan, convey the pearls of devotion and wisdom. The songs contain philosophical musings on God, expressed in simple terms, placing particular emphasis on the role of God's grace or mercy in helping the individual deal with the troubles and ills that afflict humanity. The songs also deal with issues of morality and living a virtuous life on Earth, with many exhorting people to seek true happiness in God.

== Genre ==
Early medieval Tamil religious poems were written in a language and style that followed the pattern of classical Tamil literature. The Tiruppukal, in contrast, was written in a form of Tamil that was quite different from pure classical Tamil. Its metres, too, are more obviously rhythmical than the stylised classical metres.

The Tiruppukal makes extensive and deliberate use of the imagery associated with the five landscapes of classical akam poetry. The usage is not, however, straightforward. Whereas akam poetry uses the imagery in the context of secular, sensuous love, the Tiruppukal uses the same imagery in the context of the longing of the individual for God. The imagery used in the following verse is illustrative of this usage:

I do not wish to dwell in this illusory body,
built of the sky, water, earth, air, fire and desires.
Enlighten me, that I may praise the glory of your holy name
in the wise, beautiful Tamil tongue,
O Lord of the celestial heavens
who protects the Kurava woman of the sweet, child-like words
who wields the spear which destroyed the majestic hill
and wears a garland of scarlet flowers
where bees dance seeking honey. (Song 1304)

The reference to Kuravas and hills, and the imagery of the bees making honey from scarlet ceccai flowers, are characteristic of the kuriñci landscape. In secular poetry, the image of bees entering flowers symbolises the clandestine union of lovers, and the backdrop of the hills calls to mind the raw forces of nature. The union which Arunagirinathar uses this to symbolise, however, is that of the soul with God, and the imagery specifically calls to mind the legend of Murugan's wooing of Valli, the daughter of a Kurava chief. This appropriation of secular imagery to religious purposes is characteristic of the Tiruppukal: just as it call people to turn from hedonistic pleasures to a life centred on God, it turns the language formerly used to celebrate carnal love to celebrate God.

== See also ==
- Murugan
- Six Abodes of Murugan
- Valli
- Devasena
- Arunagirinathar
