= Nakkīraṉãr =

Indian author

Nakkīraṉãr, sometimes spelled Nakkirar or Nakkiranar, was a post-Sangam era Tamil poet. He is credited with the devotional poem to the Hindu god Murugan in the Pattuppāṭṭu anthology, titled Tirumurukāṟṟuppaṭai. In the historic Tamil tradition, he is believed to have also authored a second poem in the Sangam collection titled Neṭunalvāṭai, as well as a detailed commentary on Iraiyanar Akapporul (lit. Grammar of Stolen Love). However, according to the Tamil literature scholar Kamil Zvelebil, the Thirumurukāṟṟuppaṭai and the Neṭunalvāṭai were likely authored by two different Nakkirar, and Nakkīraṉãr and the older Nakkīrar were different individual. It is uncertain as to which century Nakkiranar lived, much like the chronology of the Sangam literature. Scholars variously place his works between 3rd and 8th century CE, with Zvelebil suggesting late classical.

Nakkīraṉãr's poem Thirumurukarruppatai is the most ancient known bhakti genre poem of 312 akaval verses on Murugan (also known as Subrahmanya, Kumara, Skanda, Kartikeya in other parts of India). The Thirumurukarruppatai is held in "very high esteem" in the Murugan tradition as well as the Murugan's father Shiva tradition. It is of interest to history, architecture and religious studies because it describes different temples of Murugan in ancient Tamil Nadu, devotional practices, and the theological legends. The author paints in words the scenes of nature near these temples, towns, and the culture of ancient South Indian Hinduism.

He is one of the prominent characters in the Thiruvilaiyadal Puranam. The Thiruvilaiyadal episodes of the confrontation of Sundareswarar (Shiva) with Nakkeerar are enacted as a part of the Meenakshi Amman Temple festival traditions of Madurai. Once upon a time Shenbagapandiyan, the king, wants to find the answer to a question posed by his wife (whether the fragrance of a woman's hair is natural or artificial), and announces a reward of 1,000 gold coins to anyone who can come up with the answer. Dharumi, a poor poet, desperately wants the reward, and starts to break down in the Meenakshi Amman Temple. Shiva, hearing him weeping, takes the form of a poet and gives Dharumi a poem containing the answer. Overjoyed, Dharumi takes the poem to Shenbagapandian's court and recites it; however, the court's head poet Nakkeerar claims that the poem's meaning is incorrect. On hearing this, Shiva argues with Nakkeerar about the poem's accuracy and burns him to ashes when he refuses to relent. Later, Shiva revives Nakkeerar and says that he only wanted to test his knowledge. Realising it was Shiva's will that Dharumi should get the reward, Nakkeerar requests Shenbagapandian to give it to Dharumi. The epic confrontation between Nakkeerar and Lord Shiva was also portrayed in 1965 classical devotional film titled Thiruvilaiyadal.

== See also ==
- Avvaiyar
- Tiruvalluva Maalai
- Commentaries in Tamil literary tradition
