= Tiruttani =

- Town
- Tiruthani
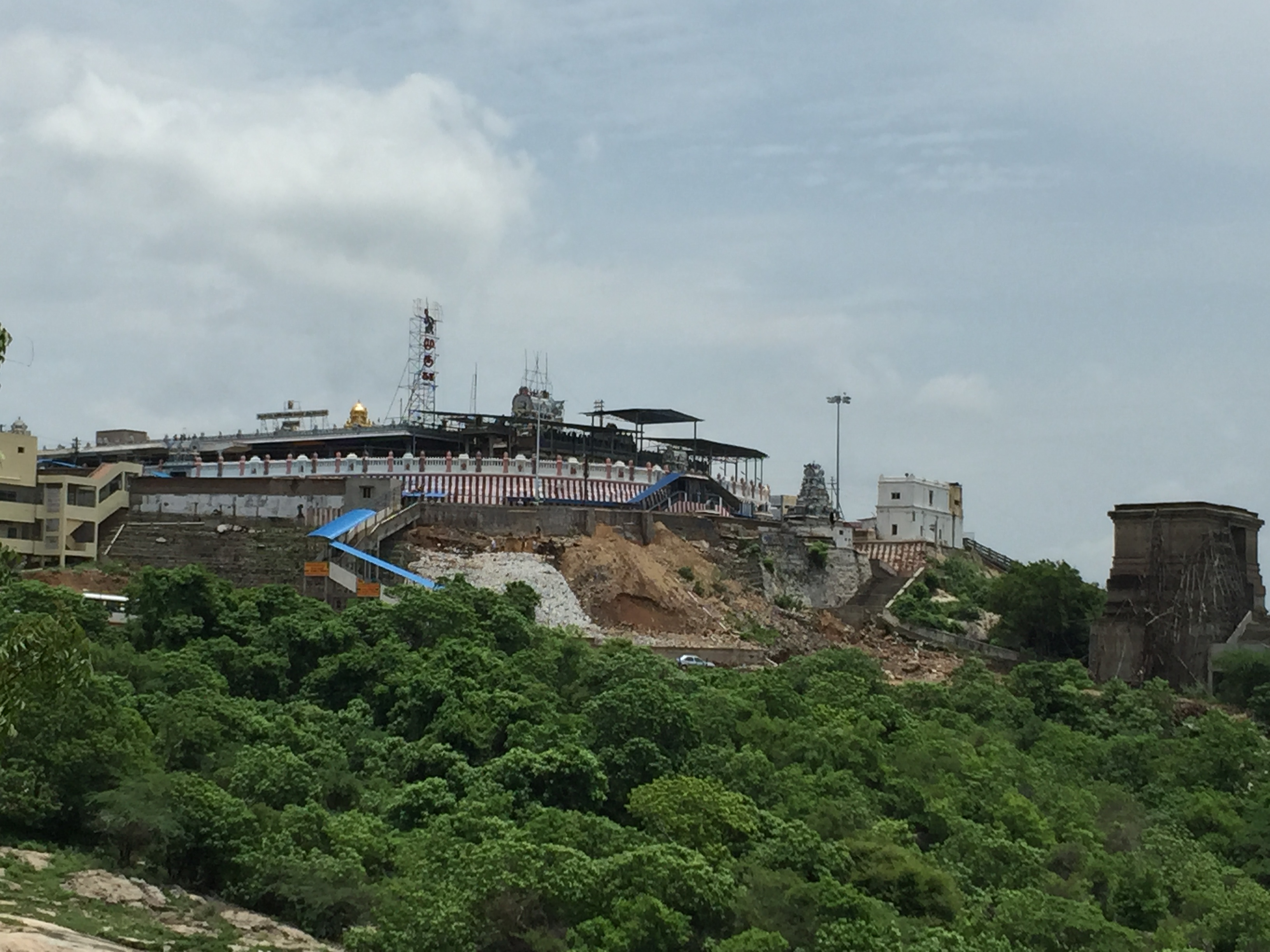
- Nickname: Thanigai Malai
- Location in Tamil Nadu, India
- Coordinates: 13.1746°N 79.6117°E
- Country: India
- State: Tamil Nadu
- District: Tiruvallur

Government
  - Type: Second Grade Municipality
  - Body: Tiruttani Municipality

Area
  - Total: 12.42 km^{2} (4.80 sq mi)
- Elevation: 107.92 m (354.1 ft)

Population
  - Total: 44,781
  - Density: 3,606/km^{2} (9,338/sq mi)

Languages
  - Official: Tamil
  - Other: Telugu
- Time zone: UTC+5:30 (IST)
- PIN: 631209
- Vehicle registration: TN-20

Tiruttani is a historic temple town situated in the Tiruvallur district and serves as a suburb of Chennai within the Chennai Metropolitan Area in the southern Indian state of Tamil Nadu. The town is famous for the Tiruttani Murugan Temple, an ancient Hindu temple dedicated to Kartikeya, also known as Murugan, the Hindu god of war. This temple is one of the Arupadaiveedu, a group of six significant abodes of Murugan. Tiruttani was officially incorporated into the Chennai Metropolitan Area in October 2022, signifying its growing importance and influence within the region.

== History ==
The name Tiruttani is of Tamil origin. During the formation of Andhra state on 1 November 1953, Tiruttani was part of Chittoor district of Andhra Pradesh state and continued to be there until 1960. On 1 April 1960, with the Andhra Pradesh and Madras Alteration of Boundaries Act of 1959, Tiruttani, Pothatturpettai, Pallipattu and Ramakrishnarajapettai assembly areas of Andhra Pradesh are transferred to Madras state (now Tamil Nadu) in exchange for smaller area on linguistic basis.

== Geography ==
Tiruttani is located at the coordinates of (13.1746°N 79.6117°E). It has an average elevation of 76 metres (249 ft). It is a hot and humid area, and this town is surrounded by small hills. Tiruttani is located near the Andhra Pradesh border in Ponpadi, a village close to Tiruttani. The nearby cities and towns in proximity to Tiruttani include Chennai, situated 80 kilometers away; Tirupathi, located 66 kilometers away; Chittoor, at a distance of 66 kilometers; Kanchipuram, 44 kilometers away; Tiruvallur, 40 kilometers away; Arakkonam, 13 kilometers away; and Vellore, 80 kilometers away.

=== Climate ===
Climate data for Tiruttani (1991–2020, extremes 1975–2009)
Month	Jan	Feb	Mar	Apr	May	Jun	Jul	Aug	Sep	Oct	Nov	Dec	Year
Record high °C (°F)	35.0 (95.0)	39.6 (103.3)	41.6 (106.9)	45.2 (113.4)	48.6 (119.5)	46.0 (114.8)	44.0 (111.2)	41.0 (105.8)	39.6 (103.3)	40.0 (104.0)	35.8 (96.4)	34.8 (94.6)	48.6 (119.5)
Mean daily maximum °C (°F)	30.2 (86.4)	32.4 (90.3)	34.9 (94.8)	37.4 (99.3)	39.9 (103.8)	37.2 (99.0)	35.4 (95.7)	34.2 (93.6)	33.7 (92.7)	31.8 (89.2)	29.9 (85.8)	29.0 (84.2)	33.8 (92.8)
Mean daily minimum °C (°F)	17.8 (64.0)	19.6 (67.3)	21.2 (70.2)	24.7 (76.5)	26.5 (79.7)	26.3 (79.3)	25.2 (77.4)	24.5 (76.1)	24.1 (75.4)	23.1 (73.6)	21.7 (71.1)	19.4 (66.9)	22.8 (73.0)
Record low °C (°F)	10.0 (50.0)	11.4 (52.5)	14.0 (57.2)	17.0 (62.6)	18.8 (65.8)	20.0 (68.0)	18.0 (64.4)	19.6 (67.3)	19.8 (67.6)	16.0 (60.8)	13.0 (55.4)	11.0 (51.8)	10.0 (50.0)
Average rainfall mm (inches)	8.3 (0.33)	12.4 (0.49)	12.9 (0.51)	24.4 (0.96)	62.8 (2.47)	92.6 (3.65)	117.7 (4.63)	136.4 (5.37)	181.9 (7.16)	165.3 (6.51)	193.7 (7.63)	100.7 (3.96)	1,109.1 (43.67)
Average rainy days	0.7	0.4	0.2	1.4	2.9	5.3	7.0	7.9	8.2	9.1	8.0	3.6	54.6
Average relative humidity (%) (at 17:30 IST)	62	54	47	50	47	54	58	61	66	74	77	73	61
Source: Regional Meteorological Centre, Chennai

== Demographics ==
Religious census
Religion	Percent(%)
Hindu	91.85%
Muslim	6.35%
Christian	1.61%
Sikh	0.02%
Buddhist	0.04%
Jain	0.06%
Other	0.06%
No religion	0.06%

According to the 2011 census, Tiruttani had a population of 64,781 with a sex ratio of 1,003 females for every 1,000 males, well above the national average of 929. A total of 4,656 were under the age of six, constituting 2,441 males and 2,215 females. Scheduled Castes and Scheduled Tribes accounted for 12.42% and 2.4% of the population respectively. The average literacy of the town was 75.32%, compared to the national average of 72.99%. The town had a total of 11,122 households. There were a total of 16,451 workers, comprising 462 cultivators, 715 main agricultural labourers, 550 in household industries, 12,648 other workers, 2,076 marginal workers, 44 marginal cultivators, 180 marginal agricultural laborers, 202 marginal workers in household industries and 1,650 other marginal workers. As per the religious census of 2011, Tiruttani had 91.85% Hindus, 6.35% Muslims, 1.61% Christians, 0.02% Sikhs, 0.04% Buddhists, 0.06% Jains, 0.06% following other religions and 0.06% following no religion or did not indicate any religious preference.

== Politics ==
The Andhra Pradesh and Madras Alteration of Boundaries Act, enacted in 1959 by the Parliament of India under the provisions of article 3 of the constitution, went into effect from 1 April 1960. Under the act, Tiruttani taluk and Pallipattu sub-taluk of the Chittoor district of Andhra Pradesh were transferred to Madras State in exchange for territories from the Chingelput (Chengalpattu) and Salem Districts.

The assembly constituency of Tiruttani is located within the Arakkonam Lok Sabha constituency, having previously been a part of the Sriperumbudur Lok Sabha constituency. Currently, G. Hari holds the position of Member of the Legislative Assembly (MLA) for Tiruttani.

== Transport ==
Tiruttani has transport links to nearby cities, towns, and villages. The bus depot houses a total of 79 buses, with 42 operating in rural areas. Additional buses are put into service during the festival season to accommodate the increased demand. The Tamil Nadu State Transport Corporation (TNSTC) operates regular services to Chennai, Tiruchirappalli, Salem, Tiruvallur, Vellore, Aarani, Arakkonam, Chengalpattu, Kanchipuram, Tiruvannamalai, Tindivanam. It also runs interstate buses to Tirupati, Bengaluru (Via Vellore), Chittoor, and Pondicherry. The State Express Transport Corporation (SETC) operates a direct bus from Tiruttani to Tirunelveli four times a week (Friday, Saturday, Sunday, and Monday). Additionally, buses travelling from Tirupati to Madurai, Nagercoil, Peravurani (via Kumbakonam and Pattukkotai), and Nagapattinam (via Chidambaram and Mayiladuthurai) pass through Tiruttani. The Andhra Pradesh State Road Transport Corporation (APSRTC) operates frequent buses to Tirumala, while the Karnataka State Road Transport Corporation (KSRTC) runs two daily buses (Sarige Type) to Bengaluru (via Chittoor).

Tiruttani Railway Station (Station Code - TRT) is situated on the Chennai to Mumbai rail line. Long-distance trains make stops at Tiruttani Railway station.

Super Fast / Express / Mail Time Table - Tiruttani Railway Station (TRT)
Train No	Train Name	Zone
22101/22102	Madurai - Mumbai LTT Weekly SF Express (PT)	Central Railways (CR)
17651/17652	Kacheguda - Puducherry Express (PT)	South Central Railways (SCR)
16003/16004	Nagarsol - MGR Chennai Central Weekly Express	Southern Railways (SR)
16351/16352	Nagercoil - Mumbai CSMT Express (via Renigunta)	Southern Railways (SR)
22160/22159	Mumbai CSMT - MGR Chennai Central SF Express	Central Railways (CR)
12163/12164	Mumbai LTT - MGR Chennai Central SF Express	Central Railways (CR)
16203/16204	Garudadri Express	South West Railways (SWR)
16057/16058	Sapthagiri Express	Southern Railways (SR)
16053/16054	MGR Chennai Central - Tirupati Express	Southern Railways (SR)
16111/16112	Tirupati - Puducherry MEMU Express	Southern Railways(SR)
06401/06402	Arakkonam - Kadapa MEMU Special	Southern Railways (SR)

The Southern Railway provides regular Electric Multiple Unit (EMU) services from Chennai Suburb, Chennai Beach, and Velachery to Tiruttani. The first local train from Chennai Central departs at 3:50 AM, while the initial train from Tiruttani commences at 4:30 AM. The final train from Chennai Central Suburb to Tiruttani sets off at 8:20 PM, and the last train from Tiruttani to Chennai Central leaves at 9:45 PM.

== Airports ==
The closest international airport to Tiruttani is Chennai International Airport, which is located 82 kilometers away. Additionally, Tirupati Airport is also an option, located 62 kilometers from Tirutttani.

== Notable people ==
The city is renowned as the birthplace of Dr. Sarvepalli Radhakrishnan, the 2nd President and 1st Vice President of India. He was born in this city on 5 September 1888, and his birthday is commemorated as Teacher's Day across India.

== Educational institutions ==
=== Schools ===
1. Dr.V. Genguswamy Naidu Matriculation Higher Secondary school
2. Dr. Radhakrishnan Government Boys High School
3. Government Girls High School
4. Thalapathy K. Vinayagam Higher Secondary School
5. Sudhandira Matriculation Higher Secondary School
6. GRT Mahalakshmi Vidyalaya CBSE School
7. Ruby Matriculation School
8. New Eden School
9. MGR Nagar School
10. Panchayat Union Primary School
11. St. Mary's Matriculation School
12. Shakthi public school
13. KIDZOM International Play School
14. Maha Bodhi Vidyalaya English medium school
15. TRS Global Public school
16. TRS IKEN Ë-Brain Kids

=== Colleges ===
1. Arulmigu Sri Subramaniya Swamy Government Arts College
2. GRT Institute of Engineering and Technology
3. GRT college of Nursing
4. Tamil Nadu paramedical training institute
5. GRT College of educations
6. Tiruttani Polytechnic college
7. Saravana ITI

== Hotels ==
Due to the historical significance of the temple, a significant number of people visit daily to seek the blessings of Tiruttani Murugan. This has led to the establishment of several hotels in the vicinity to accommodate the influx of visitors.

== See also ==
- Pazhani, satellite murugan temple located in Dindugul district, Tamil Nadu.
- Sacred mountains of India
