= Tirumurukāṟṟuppaṭai =

Ancient Tamil poem devoted to Murugan (Sangam literature)

Tirumurukāṟṟuppaṭai (Tamil: திருமுருகாற்றுப்படை, meaning Guide to Lord Murugan) is an ancient devotional Tamil poem in the Sangam literature genre entirely dedicated to the god Murugan. Murugan is described as the nephew of the god Vishnu, who is called Mayon or the ruler of the worlds. Authored by Nakkiranar, it is the first poem in the Ten Idylls (Pattuppāṭṭu) anthology. The poem is generally dated to the late classical period (2nd to 4th century CE), with some scholars suggesting it may have been composed a few centuries later.

The anthologies and poems of the Sangam literature have numerous references and verses to Murugan – also known as Subrahmanya, Kumara, Skanda, Kartikeya in other parts of India. The Tirumurukarruppatai poem is exclusively about different manifestations and shrines of Murugan. It describes different major temples dedicated to him in the Tamil region, six locations, the natural scenes, worship practices and the culture of the people.

== Description ==
The Tirumurukarruppatai has 312 akaval meter verses, states Zvelebil. According to Francis, the critical editor has 317 verses. It describes the beauty and the warrior nature of Murugan, six sacred shrine regions of Murugan, legends such as the killing of Surapadma, his six faces and the twelve arms along with their functions. The Hindu god is described as a gentle erotic lover of goddesses as well as a gruesome bloody warrior on the battlefield. This elaboration includes 30 verses on the beauty of every body part of heavenly maidens. Metaphors refer to Indra, kantal flowers, emerald sea and others to paint "magnificent natural scenes", states Zvelebil. The poem highlights the peacock and his war banner flag (Rooster flag). It also describes how to worship Murugan, with Millet rice spread with flowers and mixed with young goat blood, and lay the Rooster Flag (Verse 216-217). Verse 216 and 217 doesn't talk about goat blood, it talks about "he has a chaplet of vetchi-blossoms around his head; he plays the flute and blows the horn and several other kinds of musical instruments; he has the ram and the peacock; he holds in his hand the flag of flawless rooster" Both his consorts Deivanai known as Devasena and Valli – the Kuruvar Tribal Vedar girl, are included in the poem. It also mentions the Vedas and has numerous loanwords from the classical Sanskrit literature.

Murugan, as described in the Tirumurukarruppatai, has features that include those found in ancient north Indian descriptions of Skanda. According to Zvelebil, this may reflect that the Tirumurukarruppatai was composed after significant interactions between north and south India had already happened. Murugan's father Shiva and mother Korravai (Parvati, Durga) are also reverentially covered in the poem.

The Tirumurukāṟṟuppaṭai is not only a part of the Sangam literature, it is also part of another Tamil textual canon, as the eleventh of twelve Tirumuṟai. The twelve Tirumurais (books) are the devotional Tamil corpus in the Hindu Shaiva tradition in Tamil Nadu. The Tirumurukarruppatai was likely included in this corpus for god Shiva, because Murugan is one of his sons and the historic reverence for the text. The text is part of these two anthologies, but in some Tamil Hindu communities, the Tirumurukarruppatai manuscripts are found as a separate text, on its own, as a devotional guide.

== See also ==
- Eighteen Greater Texts
- Sangam literature
