= Valli =

Hindu goddess

- Goddess of Icchashakti
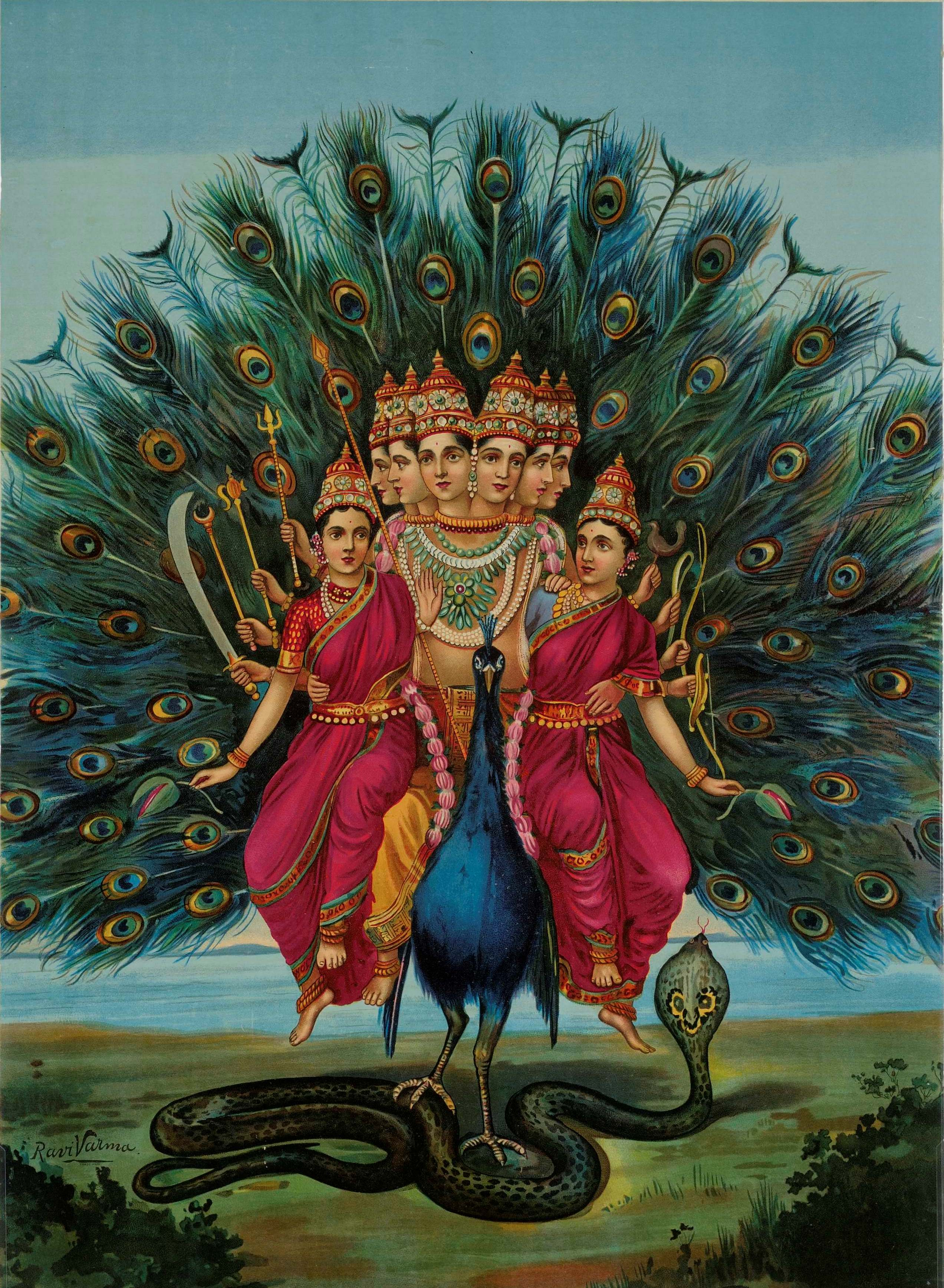
- Murugan with Valli (left) and Devayanai (Devasena) seated on his right lap, Raja Ravi Varma painting
- Other names: Sundaravalli
- Tamil: வள்ளி
- Affiliation: Shaivism, Vaishnavism
- Abode: Skandaloka
- Mount: Deer

Genealogy
- Parents: Vishnu and Lakshmi (Sundaravalli); Nambi (Valli)
- Siblings: Devasena
- Consort: Murugan

Valli (Tamil: வள்ளி, romanized: Vaḷḷi, lit. 'Creeper, Sweet potato plant') is a Hindu goddess, and the first consort of the deity Murugan. An incarnation of the goddess Sundaravalli, daughter of Lakshmi and Vishnu, Valli is born on earth as the daughter of a chieftain, leading a life of a huntress. Murugan, the god of war, eventually woos and weds her, according to Tamil folklore. Both of their legends originate from the mountain region also known as Kurunji in Tamilakam. Her sister, Amritavalli (Devasena), also succeeds in marrying Murugan as the adopted daughter of Indra, making them sister-wives.

== Nomenclature ==
Vaḷḷi is used to refer to many local or Village gods in Tamil Nadu and Kerala in India and by the Rodiya and Vedda peoples of Sri Lanka.

Vaḷḷi is also known as Pongi at Vallimalai in Vellore, Tamil Nadu, and the pond from which she drew water to quench the thirst of Murugan is still there. This pond, though in an open ground, does not receive the rays of the sun. Vedda still inhabit Kataragama region and there are temples dedicated to the mountain god Murugan in this region of Sri Lanka.

== Legend ==
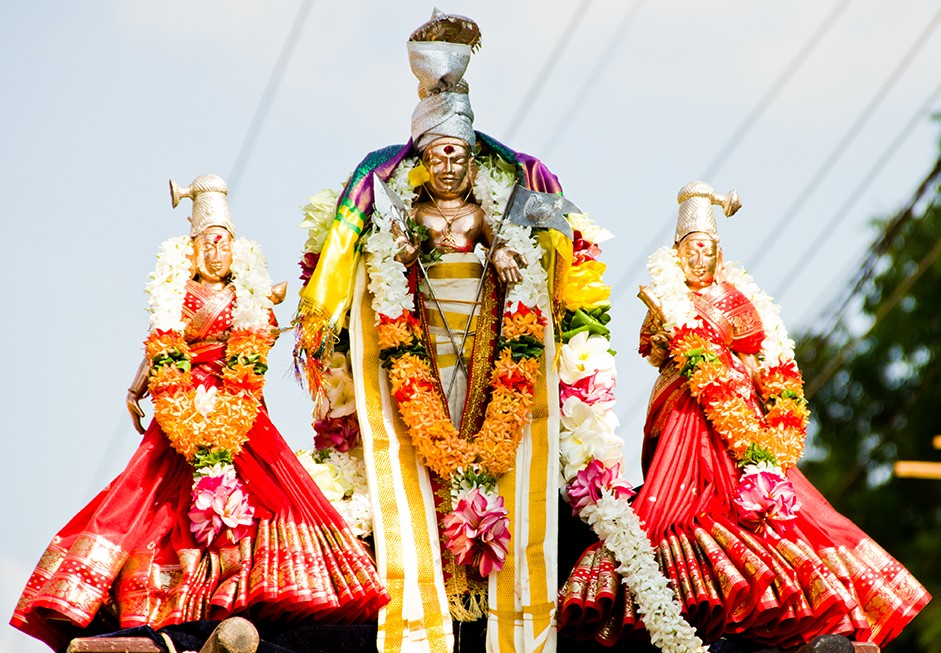
Murugan with Devasena (right) and Valli (left).

=== Origin ===
According to the Kanda Puranam, the Tamil iteration of the Skanda Purana, Sundaravalli and Amritavalli, the daughters of Vishnu, fell in love with Murugan upon meeting him, both expressing the desire to marry him. According to Hindu mythology, Sundaravalli and her sister are said to have emerged either from the joyous tears shed by Vishnu during his incarnation as Vamana, or from the light emitted from one of the eyes of Vishnu during his cosmic state. After performing a number of penances, the war god appeared before the sisters, informing them that he was engaged in a battle against the asura Surapadman, and would only be able to meet their desires after they had reincarnated in human form. Heeding his will, Sundaravalli reincarnated herself as Valli under a creeper in the Kurunji region, and was adopted as the daughter of a chieftain called Nambirajan, or Nambi. Some myths state that Valli was born from a doe when a sage laid eyes on it during a momentary lapse in his meditation. She grew up as a huntress, protecting her folk, and helping to wade birds from the millet fields. After being informed by a mystic that it was her destiny to wed Murugan, she pined for him and vowed to marry no other.

According to Sri Lankan mythology, the events occurred among the Veddah people near Kataragama, Sri Lanka. However, South Indian Puranas state that Kataragama was the place where Murugan stationed his army during his war with Surapadman.

Valli had her heart and soul dedicated to Murugan and would always pray with fervent devotion and love, to be with him. Once, the tribal chief planned to develop a field for growing thinai (foxtail millet), and tasked Valli with protecting it from pests. Moved by Valli's devotion, Murugan met her in the form of a handsome tribal hunter, who had lost his way on a hunting chase. This form of Murugan called the 'Veduvan Kolam' is worshipped at the Palaniappar temple at Belukurichi. Valli did not recognize the stranger and promptly asked him to leave the place. Seeing the chief arriving at the field with honey and fruits for Valli, Murugan turned himself into a tree. After the chief and his followers left, the god changed back into his hunter form and declared his love to Valli.

The chieftain's daughter, who had only Murugan in her heart, was infuriated at this declaration, and lashed out at the hunter. When the chieftain and his followers returned to the place, Murugan disguised himself as an old man. The chieftain, on seeing the aged man, requested him to stay with Valli, till he and his hunting party returned.

The old man was hungry and asked Valli for food; she gave him a mixture of the millet flour and honey. However, it made him thirsty, and he asked for water. She provided water from a nearby stream. He jokingly remarked that she had satisfied his thirst, and she could quench his thirst for a companion. Valli was angered again, and started to leave the place. He requested assistance from his divine brother, Ganesha, who appeared as a wild elephant at that time. On seeing the wild elephant, Valli was scared and ran back to the old man, pleading with him to save her from the elephant. Murugan agreed to save her only if she agreed to marry him. In the heat of the moment, she agreed, and he revealed his true form. It was then that Valli realised that it was her beloved deity she had consented to wed.

=== Wedding ===
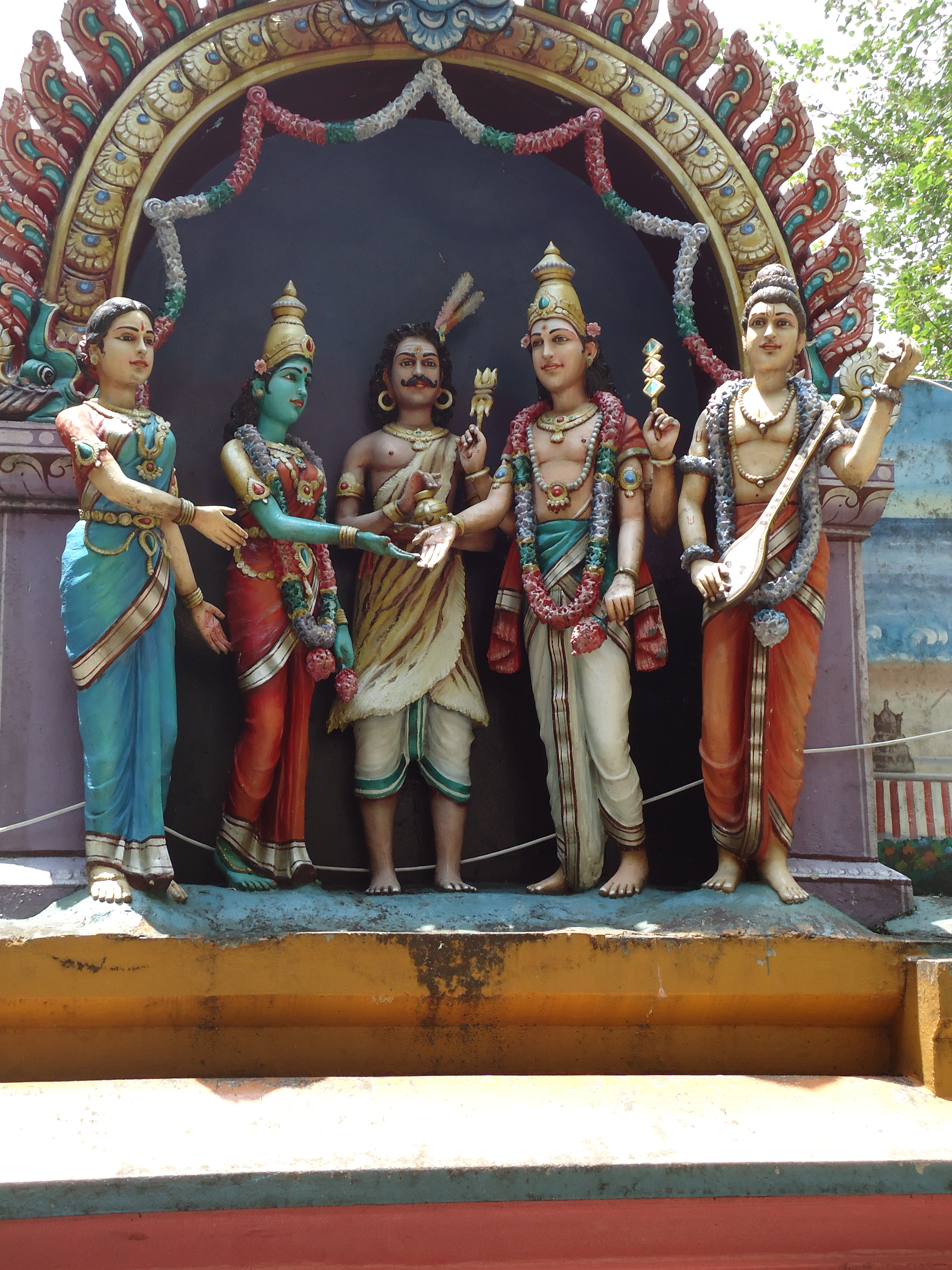
Valli weds Murugan.

After the millet harvest was over, the chieftain, along with his daughter and entourage, returned to their native land. Murugan returned for Valli in the guise of the aged man, and the couple spent time away from Valli's family. Nambirajan, on being alerted about Valli's absence, flew into a rage, and went in search of her. When the search party finally found Valli with Murugan, the chieftain and his men shot arrows at Murugan, but they all failed to even touch the war deity, and instead, Nambirajan and his sons fell lifeless. Valli was disheartened to see the lifeless bodies of her kith and kin, and requested the deity to bring them back to life. Murugan instructed her to revive them herself; by her mere touch, everyone was brought back to life. The chief Nambirajan and his tribesmen realised that they had attacked Murugan, in the form of the old man, and prayed to him. Murugan took his true form and blessed the tribesmen, and the chief performed the wedding ceremony of his daughter and Murugan.

This place came to be known as Vallimalai, the divine place were Murugan and Valli spent their time in courtship, and eventually got married. It is located in Vellore District of Tamil Nadu state, in South India.

After their wedding, Murugan and Valli are considered to have moved to Thiruthani, which is one of the Arupadai Veedu (the six battle camps) of the god.

== Literature ==
=== Kanda Puranam ===
The south-Indian manuscripts of the Sanskrit scripture Skanda Purana mention Devasena and Valli as the daughters of the god Vishnu in a previous life. Thus, Murugan is regarded as the son-in-law of Vishnu. Sundaravalli is born as Valli. She is adopted by a tribal chieftain and grows up as a huntress. Murugan wins Valli's hand and takes her to Thiruttani. The god is worshipped at the Thiruthani temple, flanked by Devasena on his left and Valli on his right. In the end, the trio settles in the abode of the gods and lives in harmony thereafter. An alternate version found in Sri Lankan lore describes Murugan as staying on in the forest with Valli after their wedding at Kataragama, where his temple stands. Devayanai tries in vain to compel the god to return to the abode of the gods, but finally joins her husband and Valli to reside in Kataragama.

=== Sangam ===
Unlike the Skanda Purana, which talks about harmony between Devasena and Valli, the Paripatal – part of Tamil Sangam literature – speaks about conflict, resulting in a battle between Devayanai's royal soldiers and Valli's hunter clan, which the latter wins. Folk ecal (a folk poem, presented as a dialogue of two persons) tradition also talks about the mistrust and quarrel between the co-wives. In one version - where Devayanai is the elder sister of Valli, Valli tries to woo Murugan, before Devayanai's marriage. As per tradition, the elder sister has to be married off first. Infuriated, Devayanai curses Valli to be born in the forest in her next life, and the curse is then fulfilled when Valli is born as a huntress. The Thirumurugatrupadai from Sangam literature only describes Murugan being accompanied by his chaste wife Devayanai, and honoured by a procession of gods and rishis (sages).

=== Jayantipura Mahatmya ===
In the Jayantipura Mahatmya, the details of which correspond to most of those found in the Skanda Purana tale, Devasena and Valli are married to Kartikeya during the ancient period. However, in this version, the god condemns Valli to be born on earth as punishment for mocking her sister, Devayanai.

=== Agni Purana ===
In the Agni Purana, the image of Kartikeya is prescribed to be installed on a peacock and feature Sumukhi and Vidalakshi, who are also known as Devasena and Valli.

== See also ==
- Valliyamma
- Murugan
- Devasena
- Six Abodes of Murugan
