= Pehowa =

Pehowa Prithudak
- Town
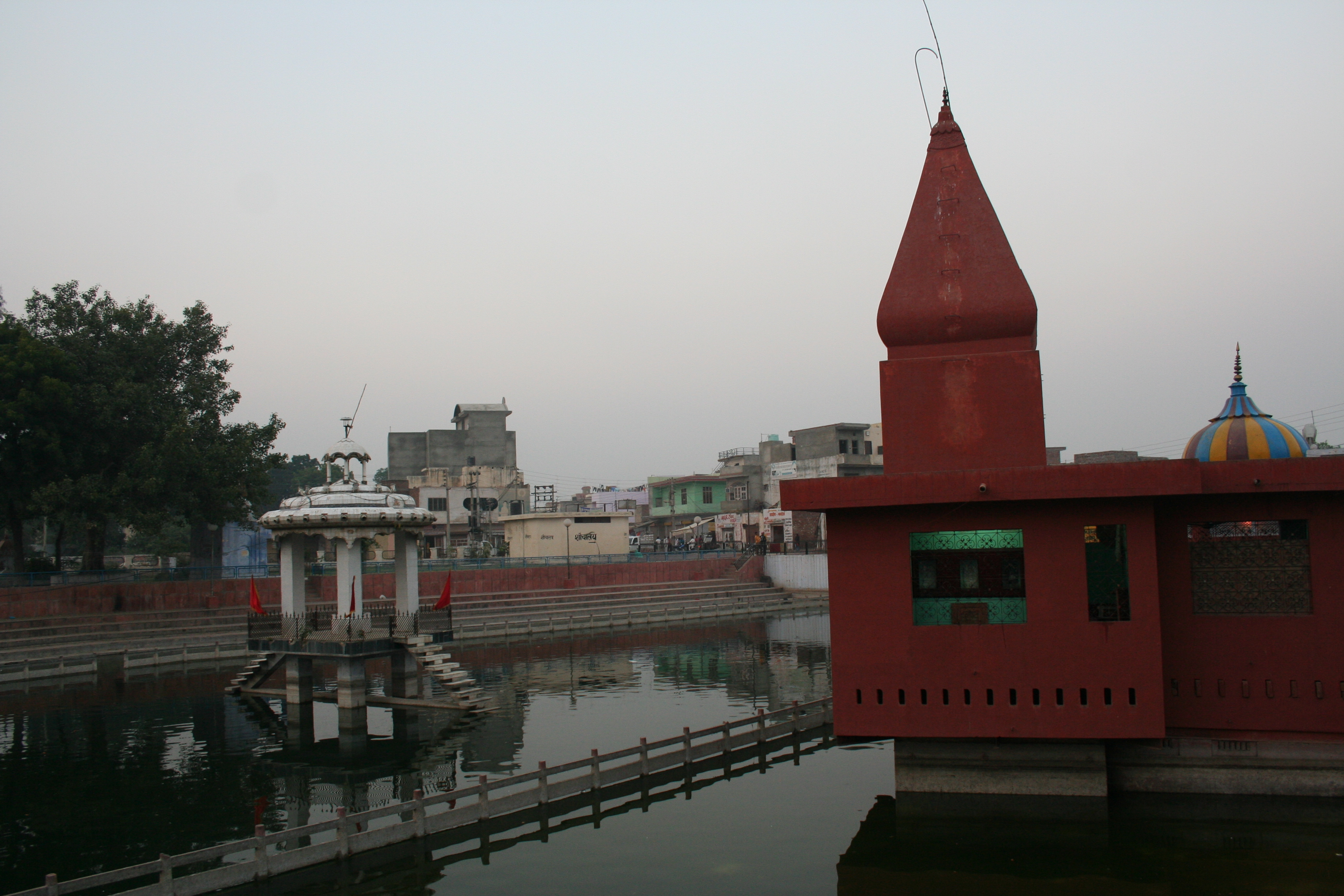
- Sarasvati River and temple, Pehowa

- Location in Haryana, India Pehowa (India)
- Coordinates: 29.98°N 76.58°E
- Country: India
- State: Haryana
- District: Kurukshetra

Government
  - Type: democratic
  - Body: Municipal committee
  - Member of Legislative Assembly: Sandeep Singh (Bhartiya Janata Party)
  - Mayor: Ashish Chakrapani
- Elevation: 224 m (735 ft)

Population (2011)
  - Total: 38,853
- Time zone: UTC+5:30 (IST)
- ISO 3166 code: IN-HR
- Vehicle registration: HR 41
- Website: haryana.gov.in

Pehowa (Pehowā) (old name Pitrudhak Teerth) is a town and a municipal committee in Kurukshetra district in the Indian state of Haryana. It is an important sacred Hindu pilgrimage site, related to Krishna and the Mahabharata, within the 48 Kos Parikrama of Kurukshetra. The Hindu genealogy registers at Peohwa, Haryana are kept there at the Pruthudak Tirath on the banks of Sarasvati river.

Pehowa is visited by thousands of Hindus and Sikhs to perform the last rites (pind daan) for their ancestors and loved ones.

== History ==
Pehowa is an ancient city and its religious significance is mentioned in several puranas, such as Skanda Purana (1st to 5th century CE), Markandeya Purana (4th to 6th century CE) and Vamana Purana (5th to 11th century CE).

Two inscriptions dated ninth Century CE found at Pehowa mention that the place was controlled by Mahendrapala, of Kanauj and a Vishnu temple was constructed at this place by Tungad family, but such historic temple is not found in present-day Pehowa. The earliest extant historical reference to the Tomara dynasty occurs in the Pehowa inscription issued during the reign of the Pratihara king Mahendrapala I (r. c. 885-910 CE) Tomaras of Delhi were vassals of Pratiharas of Kannauj. This undated inscription states that Jaula of the Tomara family became prosperous by serving an unnamed king. His descendants included Vajrata, Jajjuka, and Gogga. The inscription suggests that Gogga was a vassal of Mahendrapala I. It records the construction of three Vishnu temples by Gogga and his step-brothers Purna-raja and Deva-raja. The temples were located at Prithudaka (IAST: Pṛthūdaka; Pehowa), on the banks of the river Sarasvati. No information is available about the immediate successors of Gogga. The Pehowa inscription suggests that this particular Tomara family was settled around the Karnal area. However, F. Kielhorn suggested that this Tomara family actually resided in Delhi: they may have visited Pehowa on pilgrimage, and built a temple there.

An inscription from 882 to 883 mentions that Pṛthudaka (as Pehowa was then called) that Pṛthudaka was the site of an important fair where various animals, most importantly horses, were bought and sold. The horse dealers mentioned in the inscription were not local; they were mentioned as being from 9 different places. Although horse trading is not typically associated with Indians in contemporary sources, the traders at Pṛthudaka seem to have been Indian (implying that Indians did engage in at least intermediary horse trading). Their names are typical Indian Hindu names, and some of them may have even been brahmans, which may suggest that the prohibition of brahmans from dealing in horse trading (mentioned in some brahmanic texts) was not observed at this time and place.

The horse dealers are also mentioned as having a foreman, indicating that they may have been organised into some sort of guild. The inscription mentions that the buyers of the horses, who were not necessarily present for the transactions, included kings, thakkuras, and "provincials". Finally, the inscription records that the horse dealers agreed to make a donation to the shrine at Pṛthudaka, as well as to farther-off Kannauj (Kanyakubja), Gotīrtha, and Bhojapura. The donations were paid in dharmas, which appears to be a misspelling of dramma, the dominant coin in early medieval India.

Based on this inscription, Brajadulal Chattopadhyaya infers that Pṛthudaka was a major centre in the northwest Indian horse trade at the time. Chattopadhyaya says that while the inscription does not necessarily establish that Pṛthudaka was a full-fledged city at the time, he would at least classify it as a nigama: a market town somewhere between a village and a city. That said, the inscription calls Pṛthudaka an adhiṣṭhāna, which in contemporary usage denoted an urban centre, so that supports the idea that Pṛthudaka was a larger settlement.

At the time of the 10th-century poet Rājaśekhara, Pṛthudaka was apparently considered the point where Uttarapatha (the "northern region") began.

== Geography ==
Pehowa is located at 29.98°N 76.58°E. It has an average elevation of 224 metres (734 feet). The Tehsil Pehowa was created on 1 November 1979 and is situated at a distance of 27 km in west from Kurukshetra. and 26 km North-west from Pundri

== Demographics ==
As of 2011 India census, Pehowa had a population of 38,853. Males constitute 52% of the population and females 48%. Pehowa has a literacy rate of 82.12%, higher than the Haryana average of 75.55%, with male literacy at 87%, and female literacy it 77%. In Pehowa, 11.72% of the population is under 6 years of age. Punjabi and Haryanvi dialects are spoken in the countryside, while Hindi is the most commonly spoken language.

== Religious significance ==
Pehowa is considered a religious place of high importance and to highlight the sanctity of the place, Haryana State Government has banned sale, possession, consumption and purchase of non-vegetarian food in the town limits. Slaughtering of animals is also banned in the town through the court orders. During Mahabharta, soldiers who laid down their lives in the battle of Kurukshetra were cremated at Pehowa. Pehowa is considered a sacred place of pilgrimage for all Hindus as well as Sikhs too.

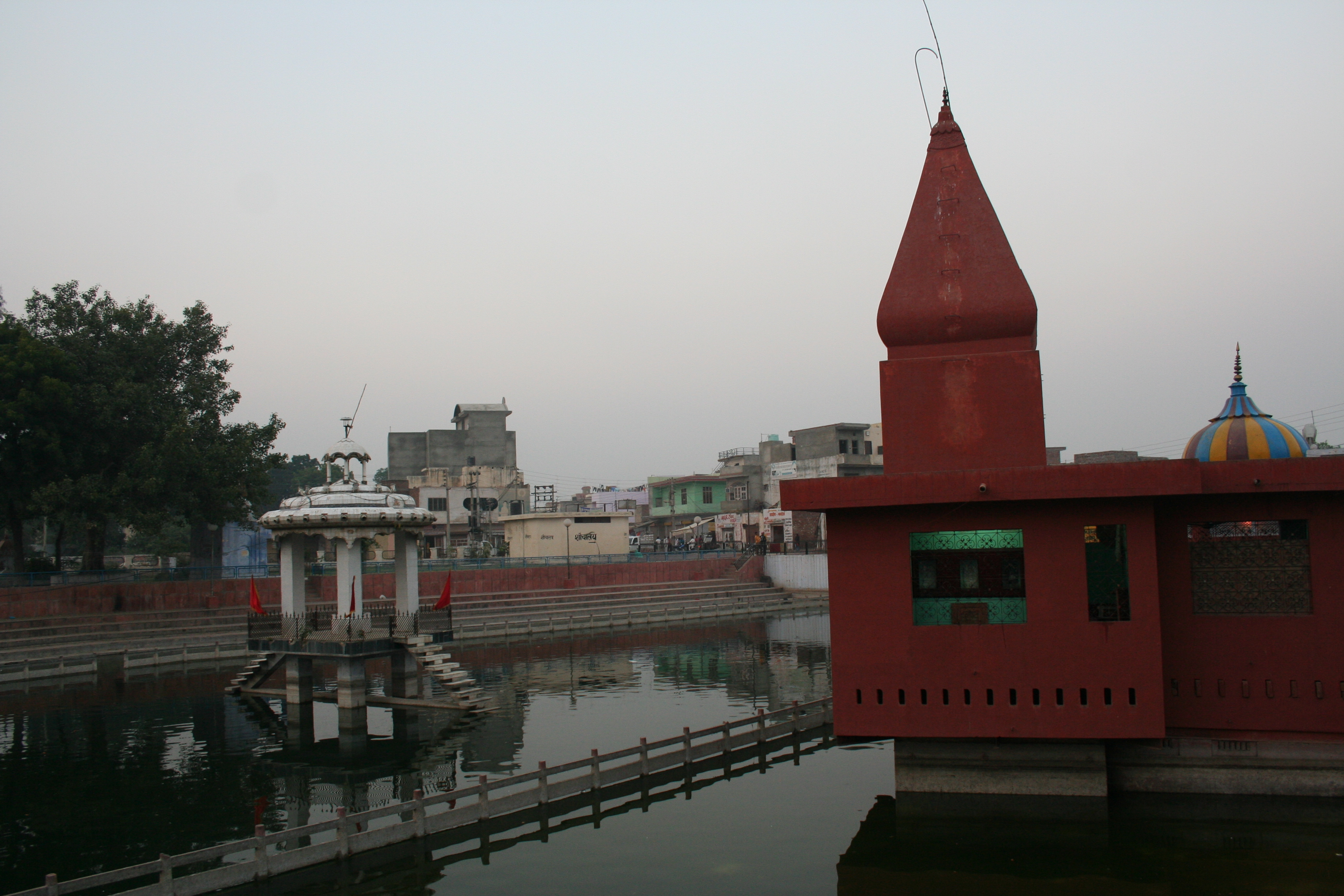
Sarawati River and Temple - Pitrudhak Teerth - Pehowa

=== Prithudak Teerth ===
Prithudak is one of the important tirtha in the 48 kos parikrama of Kurukshetra.

Pehowa is a very ancient town, believed to pre-date the Mahabharat War by many centuries as it flourished on the banks of now dried up Saraswati River in those days. By the time of the Mahabharata war, the river had long dried up, yet was still a very holy place where people offered "Pinda Pradhan" to their ancestors. It is still called as "Pitrudhak Teerth" and was the holiest place for these oblations to be done much before Prayag or Gaya as the local legend goes. Lord Krishna is believed to have taken the Pandavas to this place before the war started and made them take the blessings of Sarasawati Mata and of their ancestors. The river, which in 2006 did not have any inflows nor outflows and was stagnant. was made perennial under Sarasvatio Revival Project.

Saraswati Sarovar is located in this town, where people perform pooja and religious rituals. The Pillars on the entrance to the Saraswati Temple date many centuries.

In 2021, Haryana Sarasvati Heritage Development Board initiated projects to develop 5 river fronts on the rejuvenated Sarasvati river at Pipli, Pehowa, Bilaspur, Dosarka (on Panchkula-Yamunanagar NH-344 near Sirsgarh) and the Theh Polar (near Sarasvati-Sindhu Civilisation archaeological site on Kaithal-Guhla SH-11). Pipli riverfront will be on the pattern Sabarmati Riverfront.

==== Genealogy registers ====
Hindu genealogy registers at Pehowa are the genealogy registers of pilgrims maintained here by pandas. The genealogical registers of Pehowa were created when people went to register unnatural deaths, such as resulting from an accident, suicide, or murder. After the third battle of Panipat in 1761, many of the family-members whom accompanied the Maratha soldiers went to register their deaths at Pehowa.

=== Sarasvati Temple ===
Pehowa is known to be an important place and pilgrimage on the banks of revered Sarasvati River. There is an ancient temple dedicated to Goddess/River Saraswati. This is another temple of this city forming a part of 48 kos parikrama of Kurukshetra.

=== Kartikeya temple ===
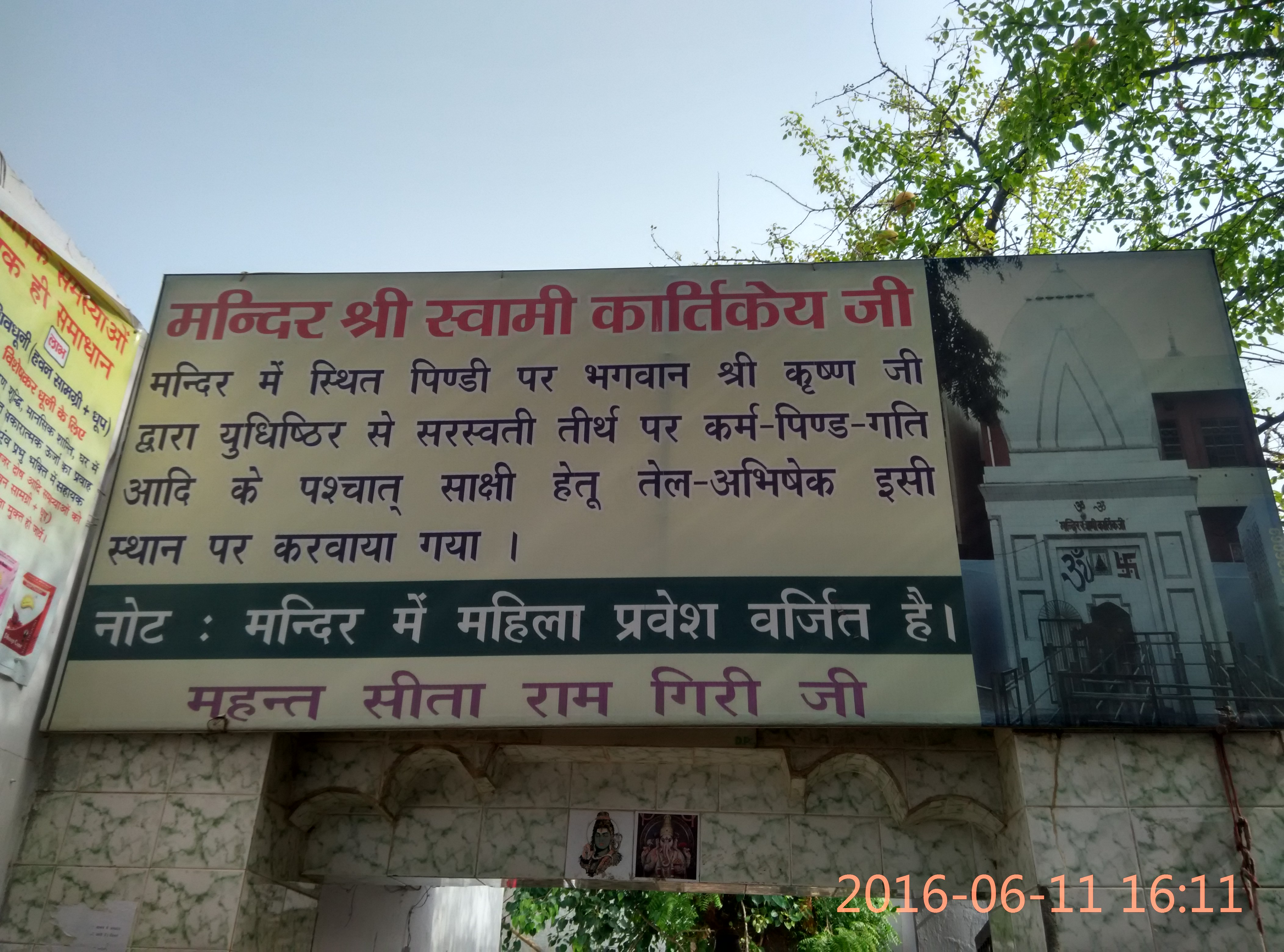
Kartikeya temple, Pehowa

Kartikeya Temple, Pehowa is a 5th-century temple.

=== Arunai Temple ===
Arunai Shiva Temple at Arunai is part of 48 kos Parikrama. In 2021, the Centre of Excellence for Research on the Saraswati River (CERSR) of Kurukshetra University excavated an ancient ghat next to Arunai temple on the paleochannel of Sarasvati River. The ghat has 12 stairs, the depth of archaeological trench and stairs is ~4 metre. According to Prof AR Chaudhri, Director of CERSR, "This bathing ghat falls on the Saraswati River paleochannel identified by CERSR and represents a unique case where the details mentioned in holy scriptures and the scientific investigations match."

=== Other Major Shrines ===
- Dargah Peer Baba Astbali and Baba Saiyad Ali Maharaaj Ji (Dera Baba Kulwant Shah Ji)
- Pashupathinath Mahadev Temple
- Shri Guru Ravidaas Temple and Ashram. (Managed by Sham Lal Attri)
- Prachi Tirtha (Part of 48 kos Parikrama)
- Brahmayoni Tirtha (Part of 48 kos Parikrama)
- Shri Dakshinmukhi Hanuman Temple
- Raghunath Ram Temple
- Prachin Kaithal Shakti Dham Temple on Fateh Singh Road (front of old police station)Pehowa
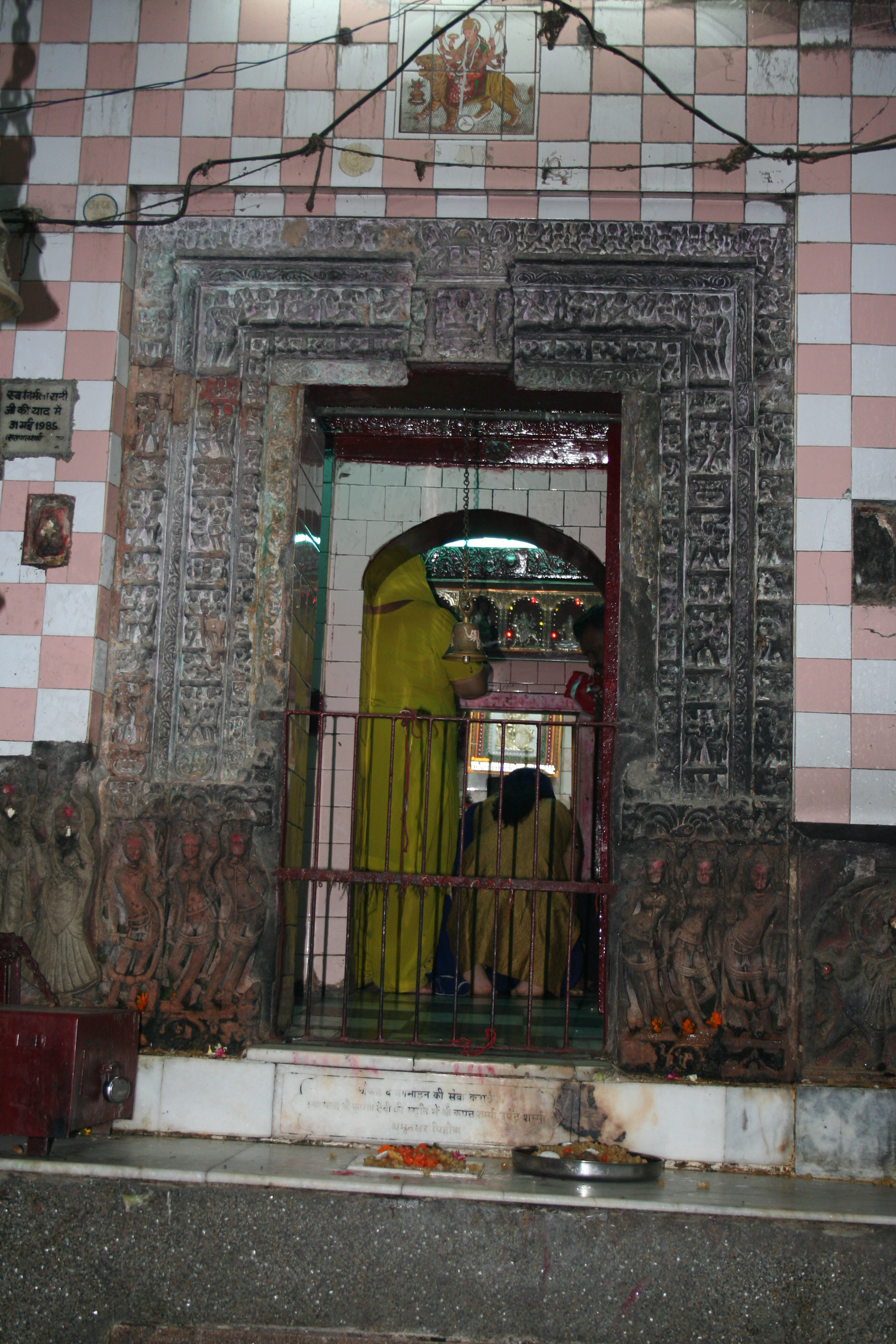
Saraswati Temple main entrance - ancient archway.

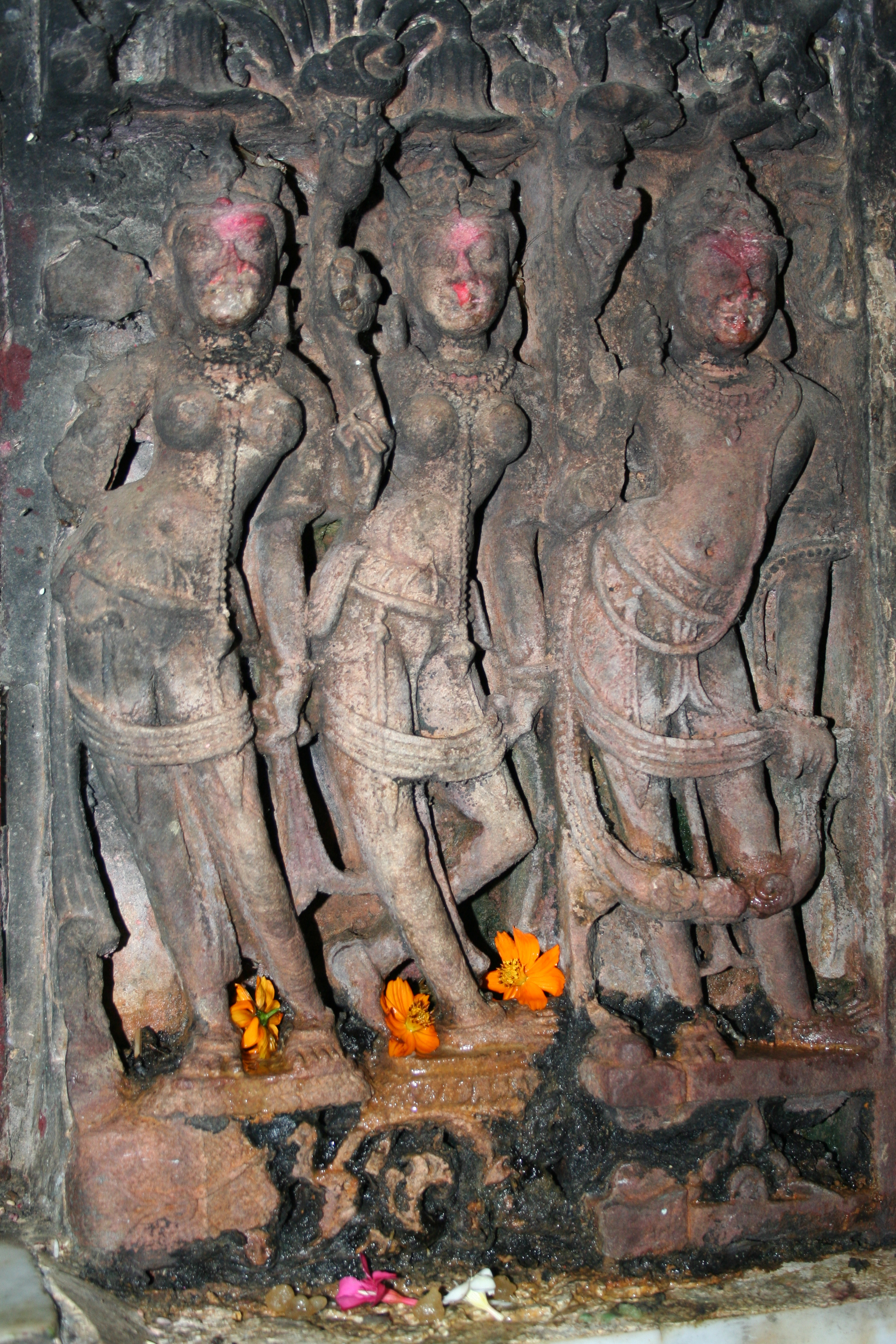
Fresco on the Sarasawti temple wall - Archaeological treasure

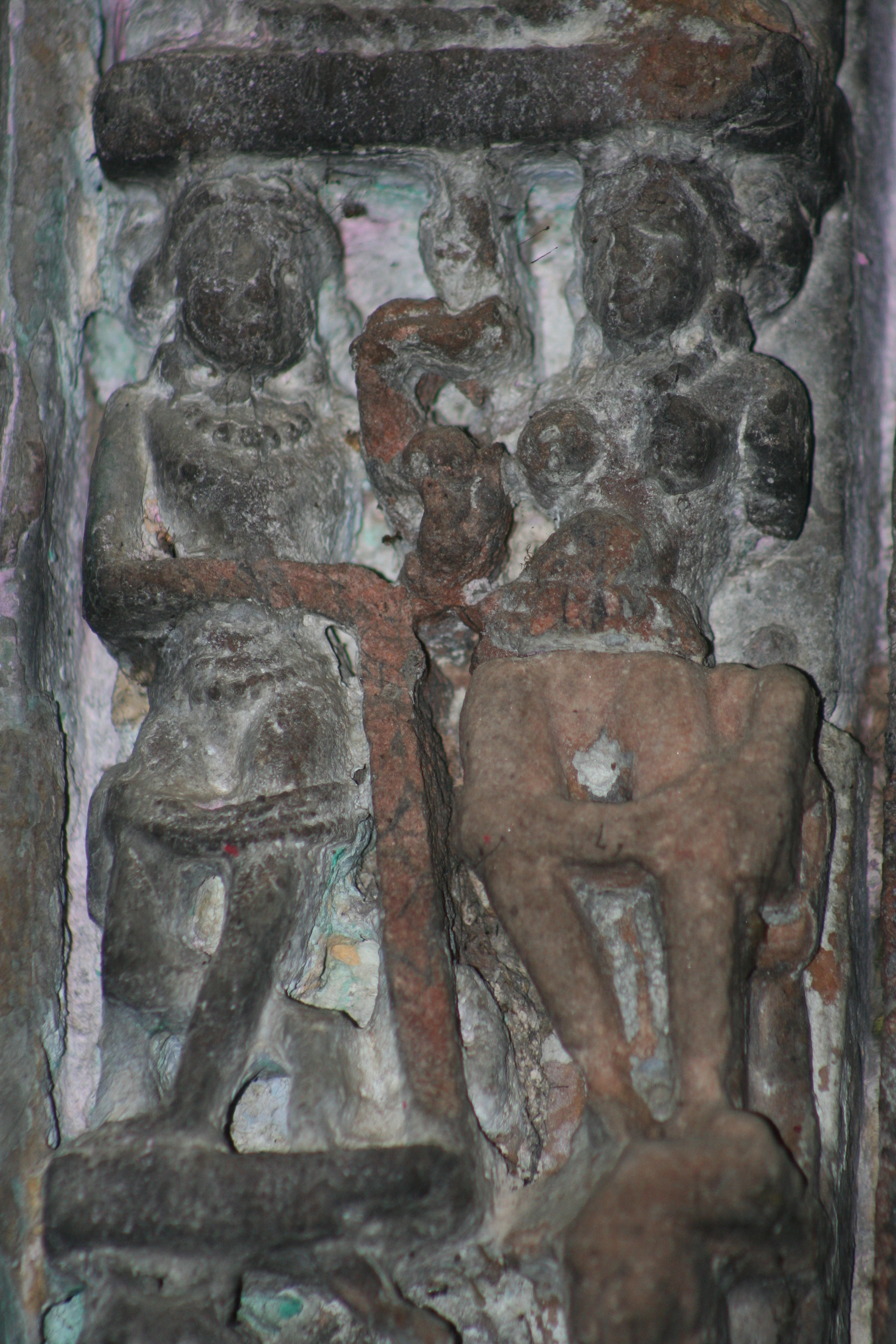
Eroded Fresco on the Sarasawti temple wall - Archaeological treasure.

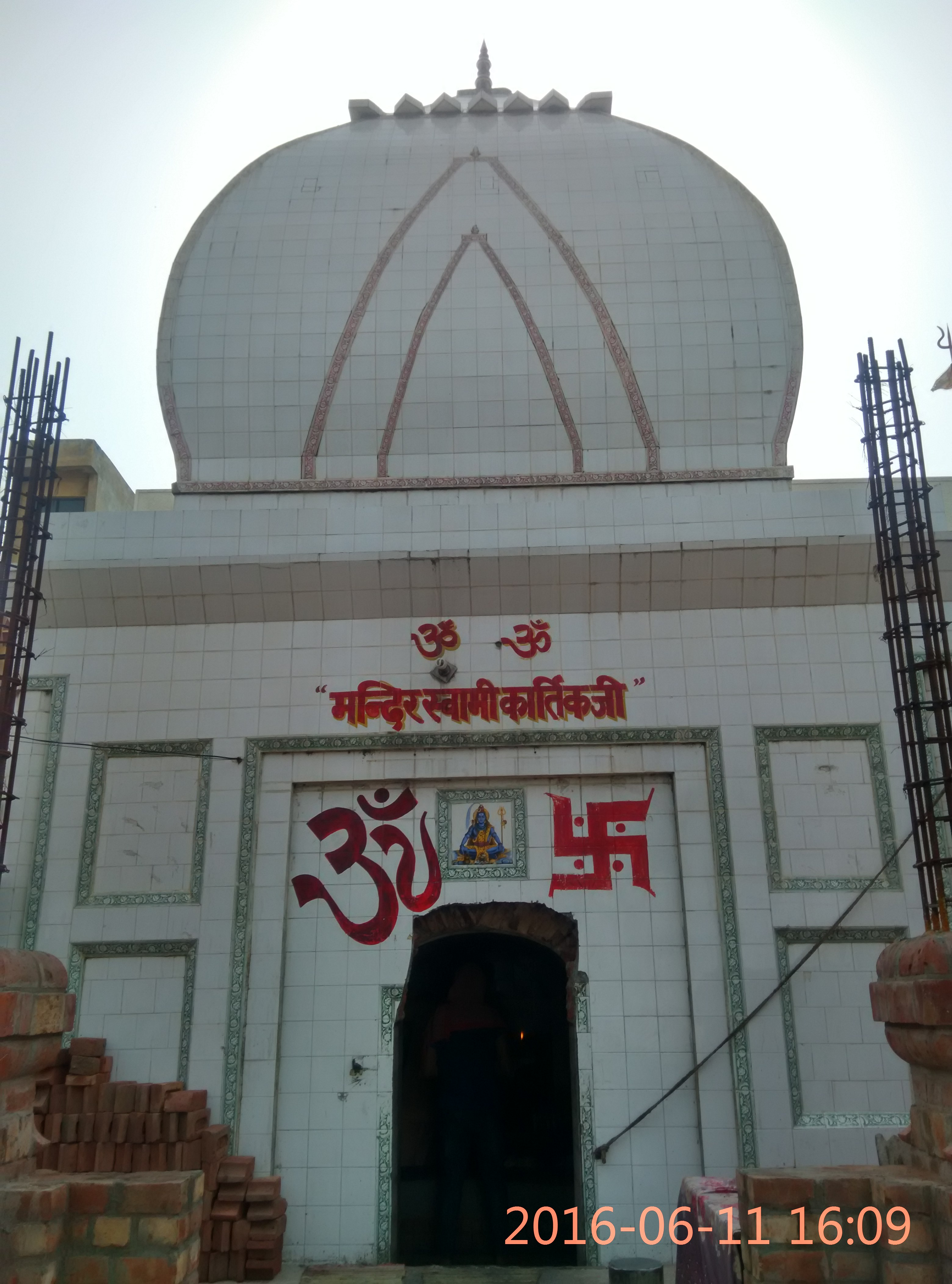
Kartikeya Temple

== Commercial Importance ==
Pehowa is a place of significant commercial importance and continues to sustain a lot of diverse industries.

=== Agriculture ===
Until about the mid-20th century, the Pehowa area was covered with dhak trees (Butea frondosa). With the introduction of irrigation, it has become one of the state's granaries for wheat and rice.

=== Bricks ===
The city has many brick kilns and is considered as a hub of brick production. Main brick kilns of the city include Mahabir Bhatta Company situated at Arnaicha Pehowa.

== See also ==
- 48 Kos Parikrama of Kurukshetra
- Administrative divisions of Haryana
- Morthalli
