= Kodumbu Subramanya Swamy Temple =

Kodumbu Subramaniya Swamy Temple
- கொடும்பு சுப்பிரமணிய சுவாமி கோவில்
- Subramanya Swamy Temple, Kodumba, Palakkad, Kerala, India

Religion
- Affiliation: Hinduism
- District: Palakkad
- Deity: Murugan (Subramaniya swami)
- Festivals: Thaipoosam; Panguni Uthiram; Sura Samhaaram

Location
- Location: Kodumba
- State: Kerala
- Country: India
- Interactive map of Kodumbu Subramaniya Swamy Temple
- Coordinates: 10.741399°N 76.697824°E

Architecture
- Type: Dravidian architecture
- Creator: Tamil Sengunthar Kaikola Mudaliyar community
- Completed: Vijayanagara period

Specifications
- Temple: One
- Elevation: 115.04 m (377 ft)

Website
- web.archive.org/web/20200614143254/http://kodumbusubramanyaswamytemple.org/

Kodumbu Subramaniya Swamy Temple is one of the oldest Murugan temples in Kerala region. It is located in the village of Kodumba in Palakkad district, 10 kilometres (6.2 mi) southeast of Palakkad and southwest of Coimbatore in the valley of the Soka Nasini river, Kerala, India. Kodumbu temple is considered as half of Palani Murugan. Devotees believe that if a devotee takes bath in the Soka Nasini river, all his sorrows would fly away.

== History ==
During Vijayanagara Period heavy tax imposed on Tamil weavers so some of the family members of SenguntharKaikola Mudaliyar had moved from Kanchipuram to Kodumbu near Palakkad and started the weaving industry. They load the weaving clothes in cow carriages and sell their textile products at Avinasi town near Coimbatore, then return to the town to buy the texts needed for weaving.

One time when they left Avinashi and returned to the town, they heard a voice saying, "I am coming, I am coming." Sengunthars went down and listened to the voice and looked around. There was no one there. Then, Sengunthars got ready to board the car again but the cow carriage stopped from there. They, with all their efforts, refused to go ahead with the cow. Then again, the voice of "I am coming, I am coming" was clearly heard. Sengunthars looked in the direction the voice came from. In the bushes there was a stone shining brightly. Surprised by the light, they took the stone and secured it in one of their bundles. The next minute, the cow began to move forward. After returning to Kodumbu, this people set up a unique shrine in the Shiva temple, placed a stone with it, and started worshiping as Subramanya Swamy which is Kuladevta for Senguntha Kaikolar community.

After some years Arundhan Namboodiri, a Kurur land who performed pujas in the Shivaberuman temple, said that he would perform the poojas for Subramanya Swamy but the Senguntha Kaikolar family did not accept it, saying that the Tamil-style pooja should be done for their who hails from Tamil Nadu. Namboodiri did not agree to that. The Namboodiri appealed to the king of Palakkad.

Then king of Palakkad came there and made peace on both sides. When both are unacceptable, both factions should place kumbha on the north gate of the temple. The Palakkad king ordered that whoever takes the throne should be worshiping Lord Sumbramaniya Murugan regularly.

On behalf of Senguntha Kaikolar, genealogy of Manikkavasagar was brought to Kodumbu from Madurai. He sang in Tamil and placed a mob. Namboodiri put up a mob with some magic. Namboothiri could not take the family of the boy. But the genealogy of Manikkavasagar has taken away the infidelity. Finally king saw this and ordered to worship in Tamil regularly.

The unsuccessful Namboodiri donated a portion of his land to the Subramanya Swami temple. In exchange for his donation, the eminent capitalists approached the Kurur mansion of Akshadhan Nambudiri, Swami Swami's Thirumajana Kalam, four times a year, on the day of Lord Murugappurman's establishment and Navratri in the temple. Thus the history of the temple and its worship is told.

== Architecture ==
The tower, chariots and chambers of the temple are constructed as per Dravidan style. In the sanctum sanctorum of the temple, Subramanya Swami, standing with his two wives Valli and Deivanai. The complex of the temple is also dedicated to Lord Shiva, Umadevi, Lord Parasurama, Lord Krishna, Shasta, Bhairavas. This temple also have statue of Senguntha Navaveerargal and Veerabahu who were the ancestors of Senguntha Kaikolar. Cenotaph tree is the temple flower.

== Worship and Festivals ==
Special rituals are performed on all special days of Lord Muruga. The Thaipoosam festival is celebrated for ten days starting from the month of Parani star day. Similarly, on the full moon day of the Tamil month of Ipasi to Kandasasthi, the Sura Samhaaram takes place well. The month of Sashti, Krittika days, Kartikhi Deepam, Panguni Uthram, etc. Chariot festival are also held in the temple.

During Sura Samharam festival according to traditional ritual where the Sengunthar Kaikolar dress as the Navaveerargal lieutenants of Murugan and re-enact the killing of the demon Suran.

The statues of Lord Subramanya Swamy and Valli in the sanctum sanctorum are carved into the same statue. The Lord is thus called Lord Swamy Nimala. Devotees believe that if there is disagreement among married couples, praying to Lord Murugan to come to the temple, their grief will go away and a happy family life.

The river that flows near the temple is called the Tragedy River. It is said that all the tragedies of those who worship Lord Muruga in the country will be gone. The Mahamaghat festival is held every twelve years on this river. The Mahamaghat festival is also held on the same day as the Mahamaga day in Kumbakonam.

The temple is open daily to the devotees from 5.30 am to 12 noon and from 4.30 pm to 8 pm.

== Significance ==
This temple Raja Gopura is the second tallest among all temples in Kerala.

It is one of the oldest Murugan temple in Kerala.

It is one of the temple which follows Tamil rituals and Tamil Sengunthar priest in Kerala.
