= Kolanjiappar temple =

Kolanjiappar Temple
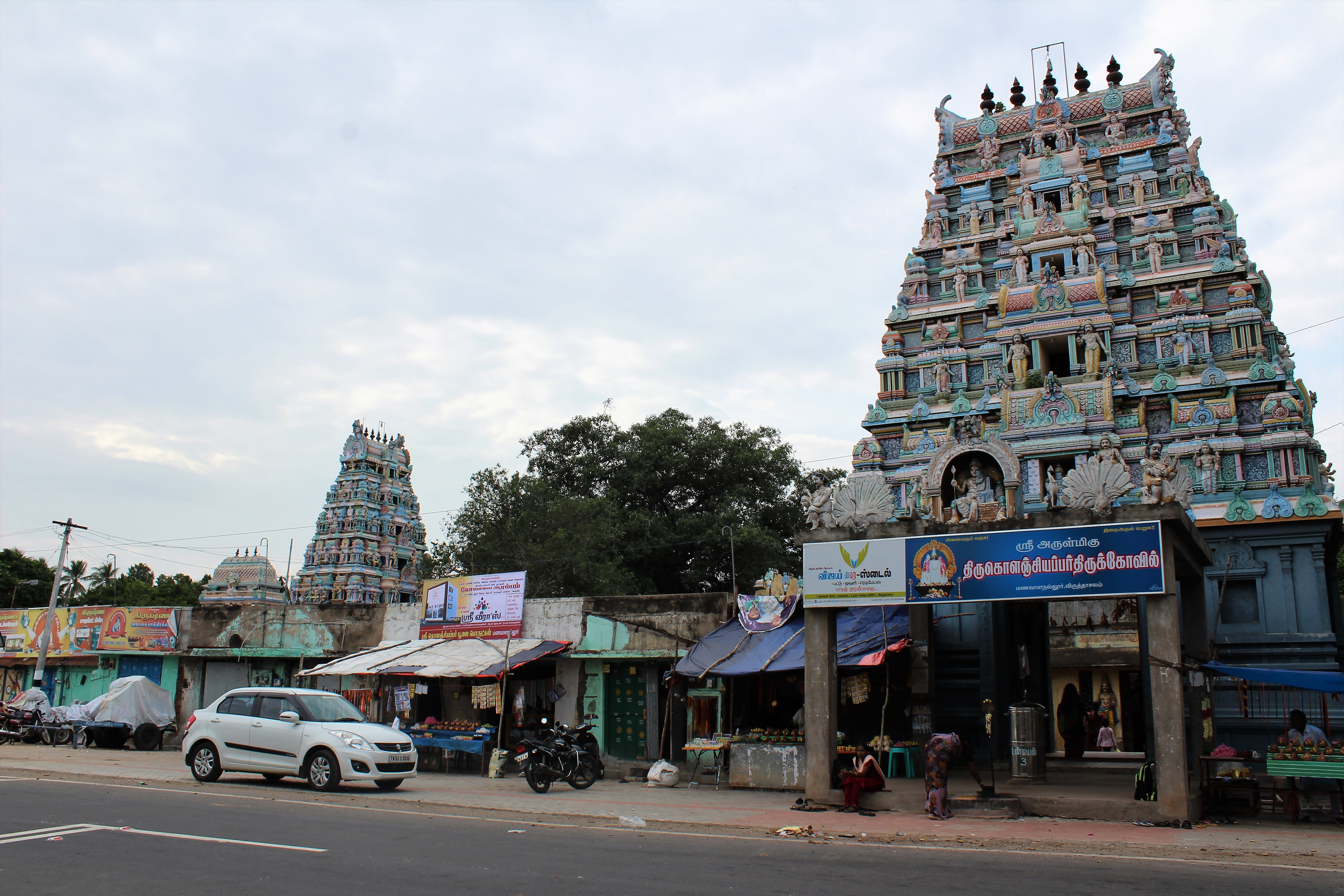

- Location in Tamil Nadu

Religion
- Affiliation: Hinduism
- District: Cuddalore
- Deity: Kolanjiappar (Murugan)

Location
- Location: Manavalanallur
- State: Tamil Nadu
- Country: India
- Coordinates: 11°31′19″N 79°17′59″E

Architecture
- Type: Tamil architecture

Website
- kolanjiapparthirukoil.com/site/index-1.html

Kolanjiappar temple in Manavalanallur, a village on the outskirts of Virudhachalam in Cuddalore district in the South Indian state of Tamil Nadu, is dedicated to the Hindu god Murugan. Constructed in the Dravidian architecture, the temple is located in the Virudhachalam - Manavalanallur Road. The legend of the temple is associated with Saivite saint Sundarar and the Vriddhagiriswarar temple ad Virudhachalam.

The temple has a five-tiered gateway tower, the gopuram, leading to a pillared hall and the sanctum. The temple is open from 6:30 am – 8:30 pm. Four daily rituals and many yearly festivals are held at the temple, of which Panguni Uthiram festival celebrated during the Tamil month of Panguni (March - April), ten day Vasantha Utsavam during Vaikasi (May- June) and Adi festival being the most prominent. The temple is maintained and administered by the Hindu Religious and Endowment Board of the Government of Tamil Nadu.

== Legend ==
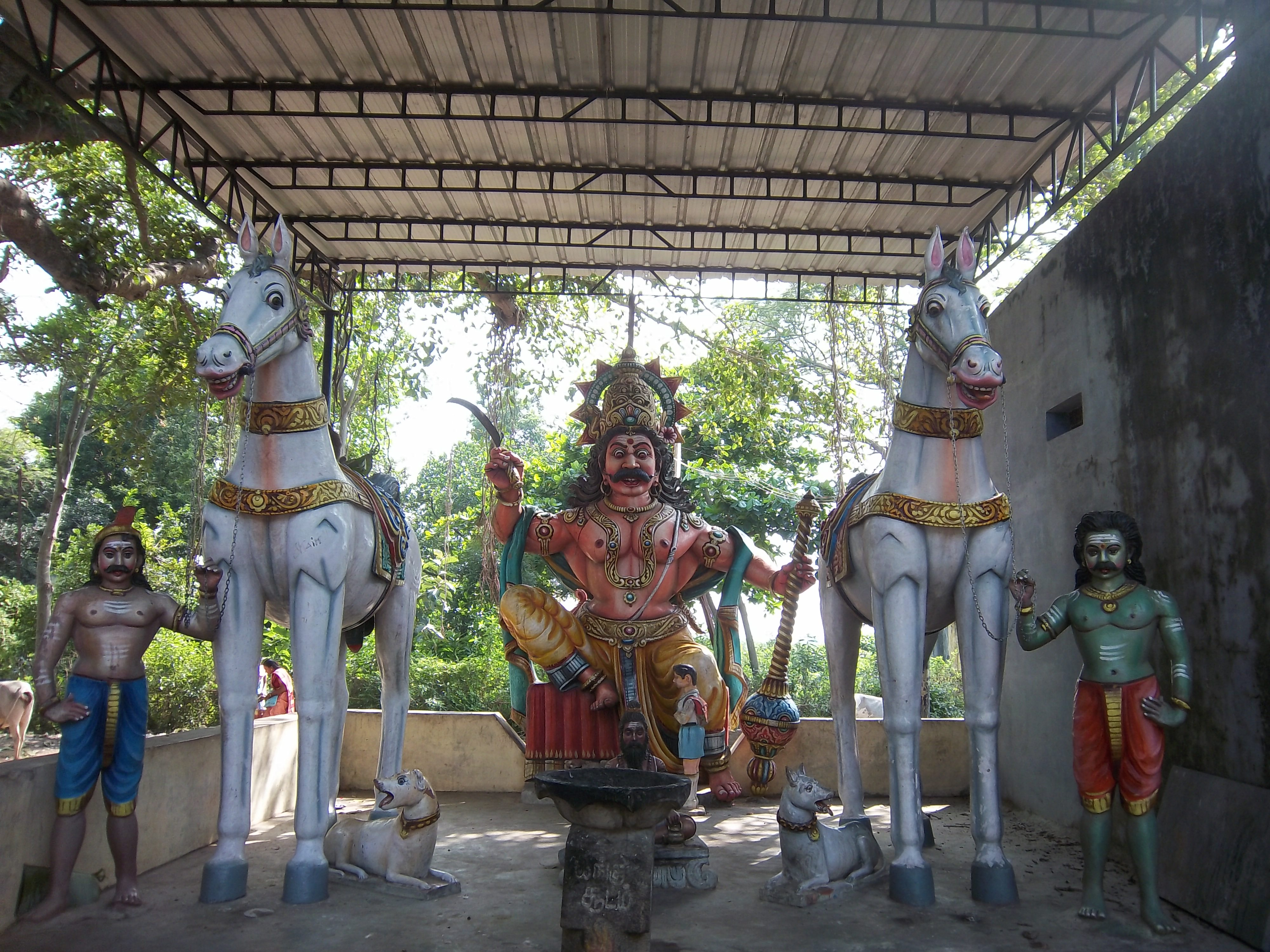
Image of the guardian deity Muniswarar

As per Hindu legend, Sundarar, the famous Nayanmar saint in Saivite tradition belonging to the 8th century, came to Virudhachalam (called Thirumudukundram) during his old age. He sang praise of the Vriddhagiriswarar. Shiva was much pleased with his rendition and wanted to have him sing a song again. He sent his son Muruga in the form of a hunter to the Kolanji forest through which Sundarar was traversing. The hunter took away the belongings of Sundarar. He demanded the hunter to return his belongings for which the hunter wanted him to be back at Virudhachalam. Understanding that it is a divine play, Sundarar returned to Virudhachalam temple and sang praise of Shiva again. Vrida means old age and hence the place was called Virudhachalam as Sundarar came to the place during his old age. Muruga subsequently set his abode in the Kolanji forest as Kolanjiappar.

As per another legend, a cow was milking under a kolanji bush at this place. Since the cow was doing it daily, the people at this place were surprised and they found a form of stone under it. They identified later with the legend associated with Sundarar's travel from Vridhachaalam.

== Architecture ==
The temple is located in Manavalanallur, in the outskirts of Virudhachalam in Cuddalore district in Tamil Nadu on the road from Virudhachalam to Manavalanallur. The temple has a five tiered rajagopuram, the gateway tower, which pierces the granite wall surrounding the temple. The sanctum faces East and the image of the presiding deity is a small altar 3 ft (0.91 m), unlike most temples in the state which have sculpted granite or stucco images. There are separate shrines for Idumban, Kadamban. There are two images of Muniappa facing the sanctum in the Mahamandapam. There is a shrine of Siddhi Vinayakar in the Mahamandapam.

During the consecration in 2010, a newly built Northern temple tower, marriage hall, a shopping complex, Mani Mandap, Sidhar Mandap and a guesthouse for the devotees were added with the help of public contributions. In modern times, the Cuddalore district administration has identified the temple as one of the prominent tourist attractions in the district.

== Festival and religious practises ==
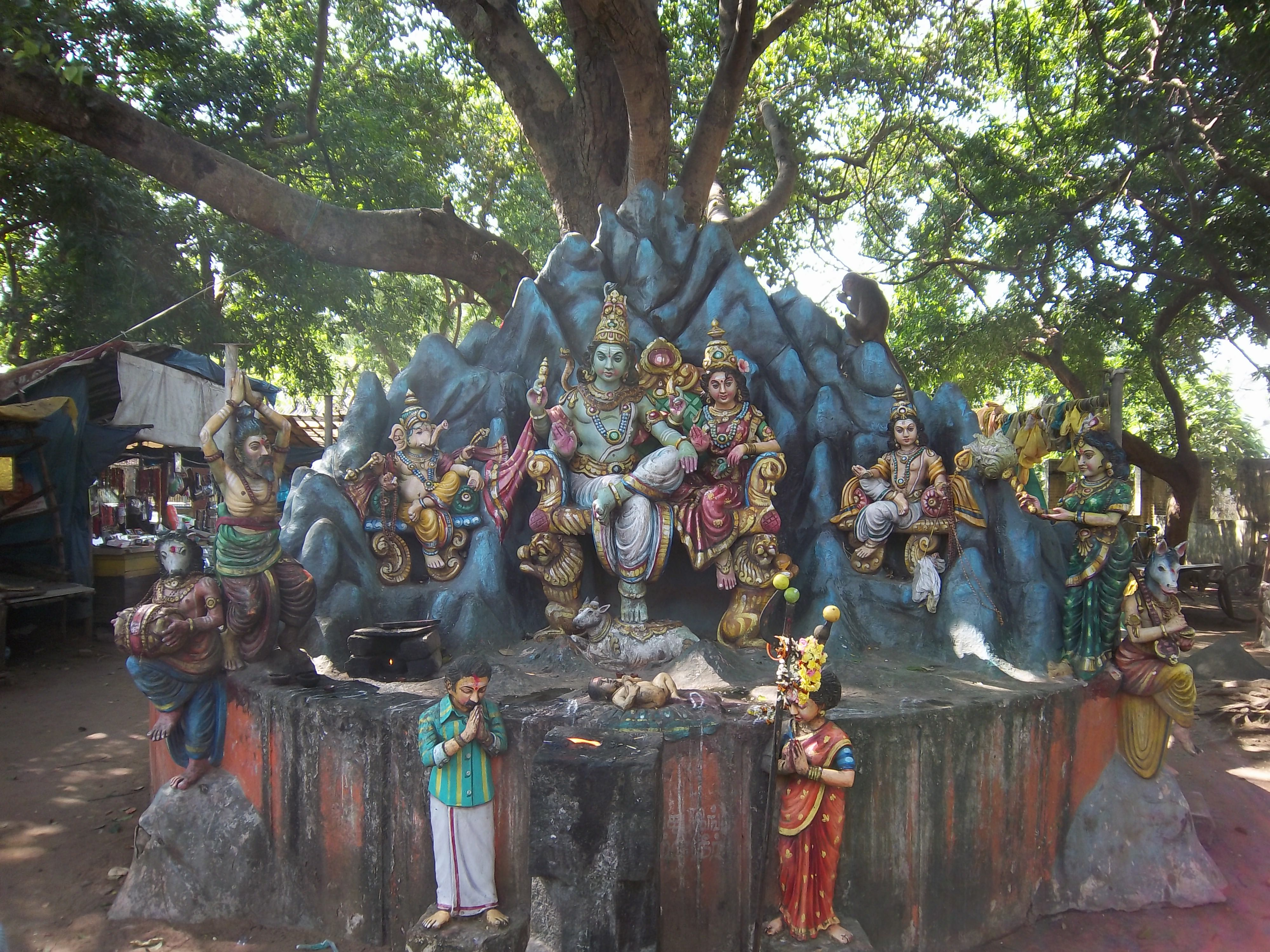
Stucco images indicating the legend of the temple

The temple priests perform the pooja (rituals) during festivals and on a daily basis. The temple rituals are performed four times a day: Kalasandhi at 8:00 a.m., Uchikala poojai at 12:00 p.m., Sayarakshai at 6:00 p.m., and Arthajama Pooja at 8:15 p.m. Each ritual has three steps: alangaram (decoration), neivethanam (food offering) and deepa aradanai (waving of lamps) for the presiding deities. There are weekly, monthly and fortnightly rituals performed in the temple. The temple is open from 6:30 am – 12:00 pm and 5 - 8:30 pm on all days except during festive occasions when it has extended timings. The major festivals of the temple include the Panguni Uthiram festival celebrated during the Tamil month of Panguni (March - April), ten day Vasantha Utsavam during Vaikasi (May- June) and Adi festival. During the Panguni Uthiram, the flag hoisting is done on the first day, while the presiding deities of the temple are taken in a chariot round the streets of the temple. During Adi festival, hundreds of devotees carry pots of milk and Kavadi around the streets of the temple, which is followed by a feast attended by close to 5,000 people. Devotees offer hen, cattle and sheep to the temple along with other offerings like facsimile or shapes of body parts in small shapes made of tin. Offering money or object equals to one's weight, tonsuring, carrying milk pots and piercing body parts with Vel are all other common forms of worship. The temple also offers Annadanam scheme from 2002, where lunch is served to the devotees every day.
