= Kartikeya temple =

Hindu temple dedicated to Kartikeya (Murugan)

Kartikeya temple is a Hindu temple where the main deity is Lord Kartikeya (also called Lord Murugan, Subramanian or Skanda), one of the sons of prime Hindu deities Lord Shiva and Goddess Parvati. Such temples are usually found in the southern part of India and the south eastern Asian countries. There are six abodes of Lord Murugan all of which are in Tamil Nadu state of India.

== Forms ==
The following are some of the forms of Kartikeya appearing mainly in temples:

- Kartikeya in Kartikeya Temple, Pehowa
- Murugan in Kundrathur Murugan Temple
- Dhandayuthapani in Dhandayuthapani Swamy Temple in Pallhani
- Subramanyaswamy in Subramaniya Swamy Temple, Thiruparankundram
- Balathandayuthapani in Balathandayuthapani Temple in Penang, Malaysia
- Kandaswamy in Thiruporur Kandaswamy temple
- Swaminathar in Swaminatha Swamy Temple in Swamimalai
