= Siruvapuri Sri Balasubrahmanyam temple =

Hindu temple near Chennai, India

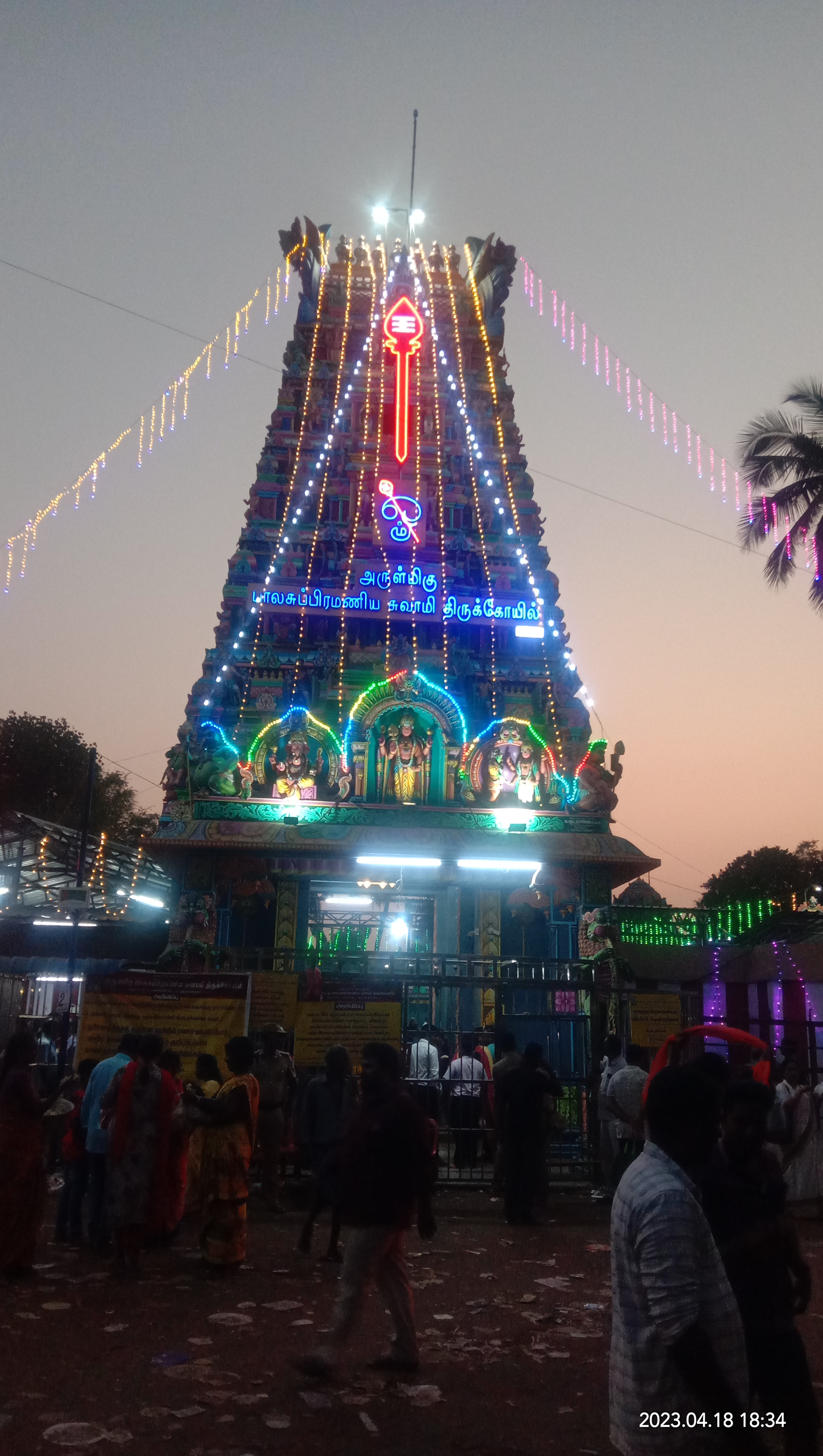

- Location in Tamil Nadu

Religion
- Affiliation: Hinduism
- District: Thiruvallur
- Deity: Murugan

Location
- State: Tamil Nadu
- Country: India
- Interactive map of Siruvapuri Sri Balasubrahmanyam temple
- Coordinates: 13°19′17″N 80°07′09″E

Architecture
- Type: Tamil architecture

Siruvapuri Sri Balasubrahmanyam temple is a Hindu temple in Thiruvallur district in Tamil Nadu. As per temple records, the temple structure was built over five centuries ago. It is primarily dedicated to Murugan. The temple also houses the murtis of Shiva and Parvati.

As per Hindu mythology, the temple was visited by Lava and Kusha, the sons of Rama. Poet Arunagirinathar (14th century CE) visited the temple several times and sang songs from his composition Thiruppugal.

== External ==
- Official website
