= Kodumba =

Kodumbu
- village
- Location in Kerala, India Kodumbu (India)
- Coordinates: 10°44′0″N 76°41′0″E
- Country: India
- State: Kerala
- District: Palakkad

Population (2011)
  - Total: 21,130

Languages
  - Official: Malayalam, English, Tamil
- Time zone: UTC+5:30 (IST)
- PIN: 678551
- Telephone code: +91 491
- Vehicle registration: KL- 9
- Nearest city: Chittur Road, Palakkad
- Lok Sabha constituency: Palakkad
- Legislative Assembly constituency: Malampuzha
- Climate: moderate (Köppen)

Kodumba is a village and gram panchayat in Palakkad district in the state of Kerala, India.

== Demographics ==
As of 2011 India census, Kodumba had a population of 21,130 with 10,365 males and 10,765 females.

== Temples ==
Kodumbu Subramanya Swamy Temple built by Tamil Sengunthar Kaikola Mudaliyar community.
