= Morthalli =

- village
- Location in Haryana, India Morthalli (India)
- Coordinates: 29.995641°N 76.569600°E
- Country: India
- State: Haryana
- District: Kurukshetra

Languages
  - Official: Hindi
- Time zone: UTC+5:30 (IST)
- PIN: 136138
- Telephone code: 01744
- ISO 3166 code: IN-HR
- Vehicle registration: HR-65
- Nearest city: Kurukshetra
- Lok Sabha constituency: Kurukshetra
- Vidhan Sabha constituency: Thanesar
- Website: haryana.gov.in

Morthalli is a small village located at the bank of the Saraswati river in district Kurukshetra, Haryana state of India. Its population is nearly 1141. Its Panchayat is divided into three parts geographically: First is Morthalli, Second is Kantafarm and third one is Sandhufarm. It is near ancient Prachiya Temples on Guhla -Cheeka Road from the town Pehowa.
