= Kartikeya Temple, Pehowa =

Kartikeya Temple
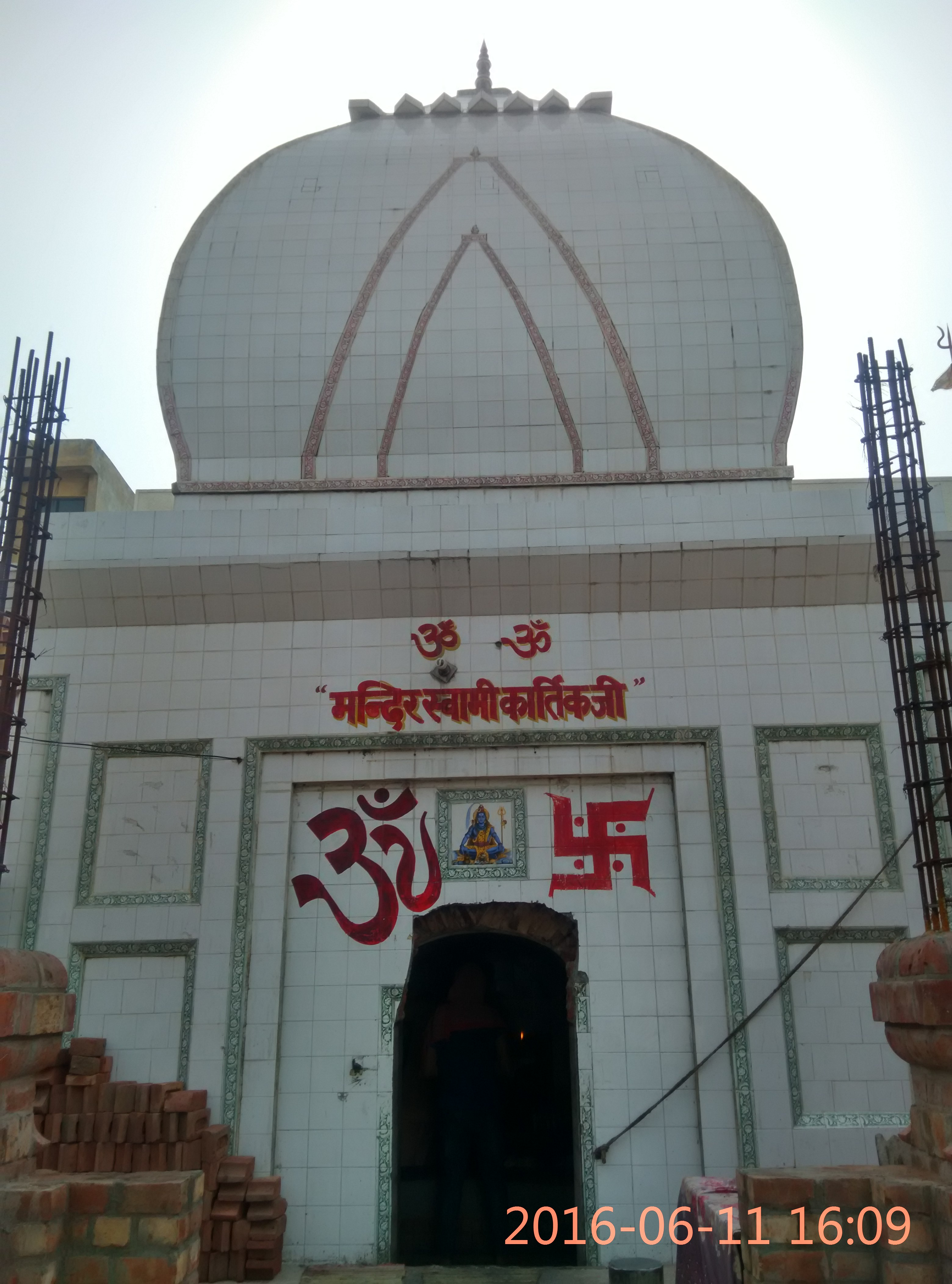
- Kartikeya Temple, Pehowa

- Location within Haryana Location within India

Religion
- Affiliation: Hinduism
- District: Kurukshetra
- Deity: Kartikeya
- Festivals: Sarasvati Mahotsav, Maha Shivaratri

Location
- Location: Pehowa
- State: Haryana
- Country: India
- Interactive map of Kartikeya Temple
- Coordinates: 29.98°N 76.58°E

Architecture
- Type: Nagara style
- Temple: 1

Kartikeya Temple is a Hindu temple in Pehowa township of the North Indian state of Haryana is one of the oldest Karthikeya temple in North India. Kartikeya is a popular Hindu deity in India and is worshiped across the length and breadth of the country. Like most Hindu deities, He is known by many other names, including Murugan, Senthil, Saravaṇa, Arumugam or Shanmukha (meaning 'one with six faces'), Kumāra (meaning 'child or son'), Guha, Skanda (meaning 'that which is spilled or oozed, namely seed' in Sanskrit).

The Kushanas, who governed from what is today Peshawar, and the Yaudheyas, a republican clan in the Punjab, stuck coins bearing the image of Skanda. The deity was venerated also by the Ikshvakus, an Andhra dynasty, and the Guptas.

== Legend ==
The Skanda Purana narrates that Shiva first wed Sati, the granddaughter of Brahma, and the daughter of Daksha. Daksha never liked Shiva, who symbolizing destruction and detachment, begs for food, dances in a graveyard smeared with ashes, and has no possessions, not even good clothes for himself. Daksha publicly insulted Shiva in a Yagna ceremony, and Sati immolated Herself in anger over this treatment of Her husband. The Yagna was destroyed by the ganas of Shiva led by Virabhadra. Shiva was an ascetic and his earlier marriage was conducted with great difficulty; his remarriage was out of the question. Hence Taraka believed that his boon of being killed by Shiva's son alone would give him invincibility.

The Devas manage to get Shiva remarried to Parvati by having Kama, the God of love awaken him from his penance, incurring his wrath in the process. Shiva hands over his effulgence of the third eye used to destroy Kama to Agni, as he alone is capable of handling it until it becomes the desired offspring. But even Agni, tortured by its heat, hands it over to Ganga who in turn deposits it in a lake in a forest of reeds (shara). The child is finally born in this forest (vana) with six faces – eesanam, sathpurusham, vamadevam, agoram, sathyojatham and adhomugam. He is first spotted and cared for by six women representing the Pleiades – Kritika in Sanskrit. He thus gets named Karttikeya. As a young lad, he destroyed Taraka. He is also known as Kumara (Sanskrit for youth).

== Location of the temple ==
This famous temple is situated in the center of Pehowa in Kurukshetra district of Haryana. Pehowa is at a distance of 200 kilometers from Delhi and 60 kilometers from Karnal. It is also very close to the state of Punjab as it lies on the border of the two states, Haryana and Punjab.

== Rules ==
Women are strictly forbidden in this temple which celebrates the brahmachari form of Lord Kartikeya. The devotees observe very strict rules during the months of Chaturmas (the months from Ashadha through Kartik). It is said that a true devotee of this shrine never loses any battles in his life.
