= List of Hindu texts =

Hinduism is an ancient religion, with denominations such as Shaivism, Vaishnavism, Shaktism, among others. Each tradition has a long list of Hindu texts, with subgenre based on syncretization of ideas from Samkhya, Nyaya, Yoga, Vedanta and other schools of Hindu philosophy. Of these some called Sruti are broadly considered as core scriptures of Hinduism, but beyond the Sruti, the list of scriptures vary by the scholar.

Several lists include only the Vedas, the Principal Upanishads, the Agamas and the Bhagavad Gita as scriptures broadly accepted by Hindus. Goodall adds regional texts such as Bhagavata Purana and Yajnavalkya Smriti to the list. Beyond the Sruti, Hindu texts include Smritis, Shastras, Sutras, Tantras, Puranas, Itihasas, Stotras, Subhashitas and others.

Most of these texts exist in Sanskrit, and Old Tamil, and also later in other Indic languages. In modern times, most have been translated into other Indian languages and some in Western languages. This list includes major Hindu texts, along with the Hindu scriptures.

== A ==
- Abhinavabharati: a Sanskrit commentary on Natyasastra, by Abhinavagupta on the dramatic theory of Bharata Muni.
- Achyuta Shataka: a Prakrit hymn by Vedanta Desika in praise of Krishna.
- Adhyatma Ramayanam _ Ezhutacchan in Malayalam...
- Athichudi: an important Tamil scripture sung and written by Avvaiyar.
- Abhang devotional poetry requires authentication
- Abirami Antaati __ A Tamil work in praise of the goddess Abirami composed by Abirami Bhattar.
- Agama: Collection of several Jain literature and scriptures of Hindu devotional schools.
- Amalanaathipiran __ A Tamil Vaishnava work by Tiruppan Aalvar .
- Amrutanubhav: Composition by the Marathi saint and poet Jñāneśvar
- Amuktamalyada (Telugu: ఆముక్తమాల్యద): A Telugu epic poem composed by Krishnadevaraya, the ruler of the Vijayanagara Empire, in the early 16th century. It describes the legendary wedding of the Hindu deity Ranganayaka, an avatar of Vishnu, and Andal, one of the poet-saints called the Alvars, at Srirangam.
- Andhra Mahabharatam (Telugu: ఆంధ్ర మహాభారతం): The Telugu version of Mahabharatha written by the Kavitrayam (Trinity of poets), consisting of Nannayya, Tikkana and Yerrapragada (also known as Errana). The three poets translated the Mahabharata from Sanskrit into Telugu over the period of the 11–14th centuries CE.
- Aranyaka (आरण्यक): Part of the Vedas, the third layer embedded inside them.
- Arthashastra: Ancient treatise on statecraft, economic policy and military strategy written by Chanakya (Vishnugupta).
- Arpudha Tiruvandhaadi __ A Tamil devotional collection by Karaikal Ammaiyar
- Arunaachala Aksharamanamaalai __ Composed by Ramana Maharishi (Tamil) on plea of devotee ..
- Arunaachala Patikam __ Composed by Tiru Ramana Munigal (Tamil) ..
- Arunaachala Pancharatnam __ Composed by Ramana Munigal.
- Āryabhaṭīya: An ancient Sanskrit astronomical treatise by Indian mathematician Aryabhata
- Arya-Sidhanta: Work on astronomical computations, by ancient mathematicians Aryabhata, Varāhamihira, Brahmagupta and Bhāskara I.
- Akilathirattu Ammanai: A 19th century Tamil Vaishnavite text and the primary scripture of Ayyavazhi sect.
- Ashtavakra Gita: text of conversation between Ashtavakra and King Janaka.
- Anugita: A Sanskrit text that contains a second discourse of Krishna to Arjuna, following the Kurukshetra war.

== B ==
- Basava Purana (Telugu: బసవ పురాణం) : A 13th-century Telugu epic poem written by Palkuriki Somanatha. It is a sacred text of Lingayat. The epic poem narrates the life story of philosopher and social reformer Basava (1134–1196 CE), the founder of Lingayat.
- Basha Karnamritam __ Attributed to Poonthanam. (Malayalam) .
- Baudhayana sutras: Vedic Sanskrit texts covering dharma, daily ritual, mathematics.
- Bhagavad Gītā (भगवद् गीता): The national gospel contained in Mahābhārata, Part of the epic poem Mahabharata, located in the Bhishma-Parva chapters 23–40. A core sacred text of Hinduism and philosophy.
- Bhagavata Purana: one of the "Maha" Puranic texts of Hindu literature, and is Sanskrit for "The Book of God".
- Bharude, Ovya: devotional poetry.
- Bhavarth Ramayan: Marathi version of the Ramayana written by Sant Eknath in the 16th century
- Bījagaṇita: Ancient Indian mathematics, algebra textbook by Indian mathematician Bhāskara II
- Brahmana: one of the parts into which the Vedas are divided, and are its second layer.
- Brahmasphuṭasiddhanta: written by ancient mathematician Brahmagupta in which hindu number system, zero, Brahmagupta's Bijganit, algebra with arithmetic is mentioned.
- Brahma Vaivarta Purana: Sanskrit scripture, One of the 18 major Puranas.
- Brihat Samhita: An encyclopedic work by Varāhamihira on architecture, temples, planetary motions, eclipses, timekeeping, astrology, seasons, cloud formation, rainfall, agriculture, mathematics, gemology, perfumes and many other topics.

== C ==
- Classics of Indian Mathematics: Algebra, with Arithmetic and Mensuration, from the Sanskrit of Brahmagupta and Bhāskara.
- Chanakyaniti: collection of aphorisms, said to be selected by Chanakya from the various shastras
- Chatuh Shloki: A Sanskrit hymn by Yamunacharya in praise of Lakshmi.

== D ==
- Dasbodh: 16th century devotional and spiritual text by the saint Samarth Ramdas
- Dayashataka: A Sanskrit hymn by Vedanta Desika in praise of Venkateswara.
- Devi Bhagavata Purana : Religious scripture based on goddess.
- Dharmaśāstra: Sanskrit theological text.
- Dnyaneshwari -(Marathi: ज्ञानेश्वरी) (IAST:'Jñānēśvarī) is a commentary on the Bhagavad Gita written by the Marathi saint and poet Dnyaneshwar in the 13th century.

== G ==
- Garga Samhita: Significant Vaishnavite scripture based on Radha Krishna and written by Sage Garga.
- Garuda Dandaka: A Sanskrit hymn by Vedanta Desika in praise of Garuda.
- Gita Govinda : Devotional poetry written by Jayadev Goswami, based on Radha Krishna.
- Gopalavimshati: A Sanskrit hymn by Vedanta Desika in praise of Krishna.
- Gunamala (Assamese: গুণমালা) is a scripture written by 15th–16th century Assamese polymath: a saint-scholar, poet, playwright, social-religious reformer Sankardev within one night at the request of Koch king Nara Narayan in 1552.

== H ==
- Hatha Yoga Pradipika: is one of the fundamental text of Hatha Yoga including information about asanas, pranayama, chakras, kundalini, bandhas, kriyas, shakti, nadis and mudras. It was written by Swami Swatmarama in the 15th century CE.
- Haripath: is a collection of twenty-eight abhanga (poems) revealed to the thirteenth-century Marathi Saint, Dnyaneshwar.

== I ==
- Itihasas – meaning history. In Hindu religious context this term refers to the Mahabharata and the Ramayana because writer of the story has themselves witnessed the stories of both epics.

== J ==
- Jnanappana _ Malayalam work devoted to Guruvayur Appan by the poet saint Poonthanam.

== K ==
- Kalahastiswara Satakamu __ Composed by Dhurjati; one of the Asthadiggas in the court of Sri Krishnadevaraya. It praises the lord of Srikalahasti. (Telugu)
- Kamba Ramayanam (கம்ப இராமாயணம்): 12th century Tamil version of Ramayana, by the Tamil poet Kambar
- Kandha Guru Kavasam _ A Tamil work in praise of Kartikeyan by Devaraya Swamigal
- Kandhar Alangaaram _ A Tamil work in praise of Kandhan by Arunagirinaathar.
- Kandhar Antaati _ A Tamil treatise composed by Arunagirinaathar.
- Kandhar Anubhooti _ A Tamil work in praise of Murugan by Arunagirinaathar.
- Kandha Shasthi Kavasam _ A Tamil work in praise of Kumaran, composed by Devaraya Swamigal.
- Kannan Paatu _ Tamil songs composed by the 19th century poet saint Bharatiyar on Lord Krishna.
- Karunaakarakk Kadavul __ Composed by Taayumanavar ..
- Khaṇḍakhādyaka (meaning "edible bite; morsel of food") is an astronomical treatise written by Indian mathematician and astronomer Brahmagupta in 665 A.D.
- Kirtan Ghosha (কীৰ্ত্তন) It is a collection of poetical works, primarily composed by the medieval saint Srimanta Sankardev meant for community singing in the Ekasarana religion.
- Krishna Andaadi : A Tamil Hindu work by Kaviarasar Kannadasan.
- Krishna Gatha _ A Malayalam poetic work attributed to Cherussery Namboothiri.
- Krishna Kavasam : A Tamil Hindu text by Kaviarasar Kannadasan.
- Krishna Manimaalai : A Tamil Hindu text composed by the 20th century poet Kaviarasar Kannadasan.
- Kumārasambhava: epic poem about the birth of Kumara (Kārtikeya), the son of Shiva and Parvati, by classical Sanskrit author, playwright and dramatist Kālidāsa.

== L ==
- Lilavati: book on including maths and algebra written by Indian mathematician Bhāskara II in 1150
- Lal kitab

== M ==
- Malla Purana: An ancient text on Malla-yuddha, an ancient form of Indian combat wrestling, which describes techniques of wrestling, types of exercises etc.
- Meenakshi Amman Pillaitamil (மீனாட்சி அம்மன் பிள்ளைத்தமிழ்) : Tamil Hindu songs composed on the presiding deity of Madurai; Meenakshi. Composed by Kumarakuruparar.
- Meghadūta: Poem by Classical Sanskrit author, playwright and dramatist Kālidāsa.
- Mahatmyam: Hindu religious text, part of the Markandeya Purana
- Muthukumara Saamy Pillaitamil (முத்துக்குமார சாமி பிள்ளைத்தமிழ்) : A Tamil Hindu work sung in praise of the Lord Muruga by Kumarakuruparar.

== N ==
- Naam Ghosa (Assamese: নামঘোষা) is a Vaishnavite scripture of verses in praise of Lord Krishna. This book was written by Madhabdev in Assamese in about 1568–1596.
- Naalayira Divya Prabhandham (Tamil: நாலாயிர திவ்ய பிரபந்தம்) is a collection of 4,000 Tamil verses (Naalayiram in Tamil means 'four thousand') composed before 8th century AD,[1] by the 12 Alvars, and was compiled in its present form by Nathamuni during the 9th – 10th centuries. The work is the beginning of the canonization of the 12 Vaishnava poet saints, and these hymns are still sung extensively even today. The works were lost before they were collected and organized in the form of an anthology by Nathamuni.
- Natyashastra: Sanskrit treatise on the performing arts, attributed to ancient Indian theatrologist and musicologist sage Bharata Muni. It consists of 36 chapters with a cumulative total of 6000 poetic verses describing performance arts.

== P ==
- Pādams of Annamacharya __ 14000 songs survives inscribed in copper plates and is one of the greatest masterpieces of Telugu devotional poetry literature.
- Padma Purana: Sanskrit scripture, One of the 18 major Puranas.
- Paduka Sahasra: A Sanskrit hymn by Vedanta Desika in praise of the sandals of Rama.
- Pañcāmirutha Vaṇṇam : Tamil work attributed to Pamban Swamigal.
- Pāñchaali Sabatham (பாஞ்சாலி சபதம் ] : A Tamil Hindu work attributed to the great poet saint reformer of the 19th century Bharatiyar. This work is based on the theme of the vow taken by Draupadi alias Pānchali to avenge the Kauravas .
- Paraaparakkanni __ A collection of 389 hymns in (Kanni manner) sung by Taayumanavar.(Tamil)
- Paripūraṇāṉantha Bōtham _ Tamil Hindu work attributed to the works of Pamban Swamigal.
- Patthu Pirapantham _ A Tamil Hindu work composed by Pamban Swamigal.
- Purana (पुराण): Purana meaning "ancient" or "old" is the name of a genre (or a group of related genres) of Indian written literature (as distinct from oral literature). Its general themes are history, tradition and religion. It is usually written in the form of stories related by one person to another.
- Periya Puranam (பெரியபுராணம்): The Periya Puranam (Tamil: பெரிய‌ புராண‌ம்), that is, the great puranam or epic, sometimes called Tiruttontarpuranam ("Tiru-Thondar-Puranam", the Purana of the Holy Devotees), is a Tamil poetic account depicting the legendary lives of the sixty-three Nayanars, the canonical poets of Tamil Shaivism. It was compiled during the 12th century by Sekkizhar. It provides evidence of trade with South Indian. The Periya Puranam is part of the corpus of Shaiva canonical works.
- Periya Tirumadal (பெரிய திருமடல்) : A Vaishnava work by the great Vaishnava saint poet (one of the 12 Azhwars of the Tamil tradition) Tirumangai Azhwar .
- Parasurama Kalpasutra (परशुरामकल्पसूत्रम्)): Parashurama Kalpasutra is authored by Parasurama, the fifth avatar of Lord Vishnu and a disciple of Guru Dattatreya. It is a sacred text for the Shri Vidya worshippers of Goddess Lalita Devi, who is considered to be a manifestation of the Divine Mother (Shakti), and the text is therefore used in the worship of Ganesha, Bala Tripurasundari, Raja Shyamala, Varahi as well. This text has its origins in the Dattatreya Samhita and is compiled by Sumedha, a disciple of Guru Dattatreya.

== R ==
- Ranganatha Ramayanamu (Telugu: శ్రీ రంగనాథ రామాయణము): A rendition of Valmiki's Rāmāyaṇa in Telugu language. It was written by the poet Ranganatha—also known as Gona Budda Reddy—between 1300 and 1310 CE.
- Radha Tantra: One of the late Tantric scripture based on Radha Krishna.
- Raghuvaṃśa (रघुवंश): Sanskrit Mahakavya (epic poem) about the kings of the Raghu dynasty, by the most celebrated Sanskrit poet Kālidāsa
- Ramcharitmanas (रामचरितमानस): An Awadhi rendering of Ramayana by 16th century saint and poet Tulsidas.

== S ==
- Samhita: one of the most important and first layer of Vedas. Also, some samhitas are independent.
- SantanaGopalam Pana : Attributed to the Malayalam poet saint Poonthanam.
- Sahasranama – a book containing a list of names of deities
- Sēntaṉ Senthamiḻ _ Work attributed to Pamban Swamigal on praise of Sendan (Lord Murugan).
- Shakuntala (अभिज्ञानशाकुन्तलम्): Sanskrit play dramatizing the story of Shakuntala told in the epic Mahabharata, by the ancient Indian poet Kālidāsa
- Shanmuga Kavacham : Attributed to the works of Pamban Swamigal for Lord Muruga in Tamil.
- Shanmuga Sahasra Nāmārcchaṉai _ Composed by Pamban Swamigal.
- Shiva Sutras of Vasugupta – a collection of seventy seven aphorisms that form the foundation of Kashmir Shaivism, attributed to the sage Vasugupta of the 9th century C.E.
- Siddhānta Śiromani : It is the major treatise of Indian mathematician Bhāskara II.
- Siddhitraya: A Sanskrit philosophical treatise by Yamunacharya on Vishishtadvaita.
- Siriya Tirumadal (சிறிய திருமடல்) : Attributed to the Tamil Hindu Vaishnava saint Tirumangai Alwar .
- Smriti – Hindu scriptures other than the Vedas (e.g. the Itihasas, the Puranas)
- Sri Guru Charitra: Book based on the life story of Indian guru of Dattatreya tradition (sampradaya) Shri Narasimha Saraswati, written by the 15th-16th century poet Shri Saraswati Gangadhar
- Sri Gurulilamrut: Book of Dattatreya Guru and his avatars Sripadvallabh, Shri Narasimha Saraswati and Swami Samarth.
- Sri Navnath Bhaktisar: The "Navnath Bhaktisar" also known as the"Navnath pothi" narrates the Navnaths' births, their lives and deeds.
- Śruti (श्रुति): A canon of Hindu scriptures. Shruti is believed to have no author; rather a divine recording of the "cosmic sounds of truth", heard by rishis.
- Stotra Ratna: A Sanskrit hymn by Yamunacharya in praise of Vishnu.
- Sumati Satakam _ A Telugu moral work composed with more than 10 (padyalu _ poems) .
- Sūtra (सूत्र): Sūtra refers to an aphorism or a collection of such aphorisms in the form of a book or text. 'Sutras' form a school of Vedic study, related to and somewhat later than the Upanishads.
- Swara yoga: An ancient science of pranic body rhythms. It explores how prana can be controlled through the breath.
- Sukratniti: An ancient Shilpa Shastras on Murti or Vigraha making (icon design).

== T ==
- Tantras (तंत्र): The esoteric Hindu traditions of rituals and yoga. Tantra can be summarised as a family of voluntary rituals modeled on those of the Vedas, together with their attendant texts and lineages.
- Tiruchendur Kandar Kalivenba : A great Tamil devotional work attributed to the 17th century poet saint Kumarakuruparar. It is verily said that; it was Kumarakuruparar's first and foremost work. The lord of Tiruchendur granted the boon of speech to the mute child Kumarakuruparar and blessed him with the virtue of devotion. It is also said that those whom hear to the songs of this work will be dispelled of all their miseries and also will be granted the boon of speech.
- Tiruchendur Murugan Pillaitamil _ A Tamil Hindu work eulogizing the most adored deity of Tamils; Murugan. It was composed by Pagalik Koothar (பகழிக் கூத்தர்) .
- Tiruppaadal Tirattu __ A compendium of 1452 songs in 52 headings (titles), by Taayumanavar .
- Tirumurai – an important Tamil twelve volumes compendium that consists of Shaivite hymns.
- Tiruvārūr Nānmanimālai _ A Tamil literary work dealt with the presiding deity of Tiruvārur (Shiva) . It is attributed to the 17th century Tamil Hindu saint poet Kumarakuruparar.
- Tiruvārūr Ulā _ A Tamil Hindu devotional work attributed to Andhakak Kavi Veera Ragavar (அந்தகக் கவி வீர இராகவர்) .
- Thiruvasagam – a Tamil Shaivite scripture sung by saint Manikkavacakar.
- Tiruvundiyar (திருவுந்தியார்) _ One of the 12 Shaiva Siddhanta commentary scriptures of the Tamil tradition attributed to Tiruviyalur Uyyavandha Deva Nayanar.
- Tirukkālathi Nādarula __ A Tamil Saivate work sung on the presiding deity of Tirukkālathi (Srikalahasti) .
- Tirukkalitrupadiyar _ Tamil Saivate work attributed to Tirukkadavūr Uyyavanda Deva Nayanar.
- Tirukovai – a Tamil Shaivite scripture sung by Manikkavacakar.
- Tirukkutrala Nadar Ula (திருக்குற்றால நாதர் உலா) : One of the greatest devotional Tamil literary work of the 17th century attributed to the saint poet Tirikoodappa Rasappa Kavirayar. The Nayaka rulers gifted him fertile lands and had gifted him territory too for compiling this great work.
- Tiruvāvadudurai Kovai _ A Tamil Shaivite work composed on the deity of Tiruvavaduthurai.
- Tiruvegambamudayar Tiruvandaadi _ A Tamil Shaivite work attributed to the great poet saint Pattinathar.
- Tevaram – An important Tamil Shaivite scripture and devotional poetry.
- Thiruvilaiyadal Puranam – a Tamil Shaivite scripture written by Paranjothi that describes the 64 divine plays of Shiva in Madurai as the spouse of the goddess Meenakshi.
- Tirukkural – an important Tamil scripture in Tamil Nadu written by Tamil poet and philosopher Thiruvalluvar.
- Tirumantiram – an important Tamil Shaivite work of religious poetry written by the siddhar-saint Tirumular.
- Thiruvarutpa – a Tamil Shaivite scripture written by the siddha-saint Ramalinga Swamigal.
- Tiruppugal – an important Tamil Shaivite scripture written by the siddhar-saint Arunagirinathar.
- Tirumurugatrupadai __ Ancient Tamil work in praise of Lord Murugan. __ Nakkiranar
- Tiruvaaimozhi __ Tamil Vaishnavaite work of Nammalwar (One of the twelve Alwaars)
- Tiruviruttam __ Nammalvar
- Tiruppaavai _ A collection of hymns composed by Aandal in her love and devotion to (Narayana) ...
- Tirukkuruntantakam __ Composed by the Tamil saint Tirumangai Aalvar .
- Tiruvempavai __ Composed by the Tamil Shaiva Naayanar (Adiyar) Mannickavasagar in devotion to lord Shiva...
- Thiruppā _ Composed by the Tamil saint Paamban Swamigal.
- Thiruvalaṅkatiraṭṭu _ Tamil Hindu work composed by Paamban Swamigal.
- Tiruvaalankaadu Tiruppathigam _ Composed by Karaikal Ammaiyar .
- Tiruvirattai Manimaalai __ Composed by Karaikal Ammaiyar.
- Thirukazhumala Mummanikkovai _ Attributed to the works of Pattinathaar in Tamil language.
- Thiruvidai Marudhur Mummanikkovai _ The songs sung by the Tamil Hindu saint Pattinathar.
- Thiruvegambamudaiyar Thiruvandhaadhi _ The songs sung by the Tamil Hindu saint Pattinathar of divine experiences.
- Thiruvottriyur Orupa Orupadhu _ Songs sung by the Tamil Hindu saint Pattinathar.

== U ==
- Upanishad (उपनिषद्): Part of the Hindu Śruti scriptures which primarily discuss meditation and philosophy, called the "scriptures par excellence" of Hinduism.
- Upaveda: minor Vedas.
- Upapurana: minor Puranas

== V ==
- Vasishtha Samhita: Yoga text, one of the first to describe non-seated hatha yoga asanas ascribed to the sage Vasishtha.
- Veda (वेद): Vedas are texts without start and end, stated Swami Vivekananda, and they include "the accumulated treasury of spiritual laws discovered by different persons in different times." Collectively refers to a corpus of ancient Indian religious literature that are considered by adherents of Hinduism to be Śruti (that which is heard).
- Vedarthasamgraha: A Sanskrit treatise by Ramanuja on the philosophy of Vishishtadvaita.
- Venvaroha: Mathematical and astrological work by Mādhava (c.1350 – c.1425) of Sangamagrāma the founder of the Kerala school of astronomy and mathematics.
- Vedanga: limbs of the Veda.
- Vishnugeeta : A Malayalam work by the poet saint Poonthanam.
- Vachanamrut: (IAST: Vacanāmṛta, lit. "immortalising ambrosia in the form of words") is a sacred Hindu text consisting of 273 religious discourses delivered by Swaminarayan from 1819 to 1829 CE and is considered the principal theological text within the Swaminarayan Sampradaya. Compiled by five of his senior disciples, Swaminarayan edited and approved the scripture
- Vinaayagar Agaval _ A Tamil work in praise of Lord Ganesha (Vinaayakan).

== Y ==
- Yadavabhyudaya: A Sanskrit epic poem by Vedanta Desika on the life and deeds of Krishna.
- Yoga Sutra (योग सूत्र): One of the six darshanas of Hindu or Vedic schools and, alongside the Bhagavad Gita and Hatha Yoga Pradipika, are a milestone in the history of Yoga, compiled sometime between 500 BCE and 400 CE by the sage Patanjali
- Yoga Vasistha, the discourse of sage Vasistha to prince Rama. It is an important text of Yoga as well as Advaita Vedanta. The book consists of around thirty thousand slokas as well as numerous short stories and anecdotes.
- Yoga Yajnavalkya (योगयाज्ञवल्क्य): a classical treatise on yoga traditionally attributed to sage Yajnavalkya.
- Yuktibhāṣā (Malayalam: യുക്തിഭാഷ) also known as Gaṇitanyāyasaṅgraha (Compendium of Astronomical Rationale), is a major treatise on mathematics and astronomy, written by the Indian astronomer Jyesthadeva of the Kerala school of mathematics around 1530.

== See also ==
- Timeline of Hindu texts
