= Hindu texts =

Hindu texts or Hindu scriptures are manuscripts and voluminous historical literature which are related to any of the diverse traditions within Hinduism. Some of the major Hindu texts include the Vedas, the Upanishads, the Itihasa (the Mahabharata and the Ramayana) and the Puranas. Scholars hesitate to define the term "Hindu scriptures" given the diverse nature of Hinduism, but many list the Agamas as Hindu scriptures, and Dominic Goodall includes the Bhagavata Purana and Yajnavalkya Smriti in the list of Hindu scriptures as well.

== History ==
There are two historic classifications of Hindu texts: Shruti (Sanskrit: श्रुति, IAST: Śruti)—"that which is heard", and Smriti (Sanskrit: स्मृति, IAST: Smṛti)—"that which is remembered".

The Shruti texts refer to the body of most authoritative and ancient religious texts, believed to be eternal knowledge authored neither by a human nor a divine agent, but transmitted by sages (rishis). These texts comprise the central canon of Hinduism. This canon includes the four Vedas with their four types of embedded texts: the Samhitas, the Brahmanas, the Aranyakas and the Upanishads. Of the Shrutis, the Upanishads alone are widely influential among Hindus, considered scriptures par excellence of Hinduism, and their central ideas have continued to influence its thought and traditions.

The Smriti texts are a specific body of Hindu texts attributed to an author; as derivative works they are considered less authoritative than Shruti in Hinduism. The Smriti literature is a vast corpus of diverse texts, and includes but is not limited to Vedāngas, the Hindu epics (such as the Mahabharata and Ramayana), the Sutras and Shastras, the texts of Hindu philosophies, the Puranas, the Kāvya or poetical literature, the Bhasyas, and numerous Nibandhas (digests) covering politics, ethics, culture, arts, and society.

Many ancient Hindu texts were composed in Sanskrit and other regional Indian languages. In modern times, most ancient texts have been translated into other Indian languages and some into non-Indian languages. Prior to the start of the Common Era, the Hindu texts were composed orally, then memorized and transmitted orally, from one generation to the next, for more than a millennium before they were written down in manuscripts. This verbal tradition of preserving and transmitting Hindu texts, from one generation to the next, continued into the modern era.

== Shruti ==
The Shruti ("that which is heard") texts constitute the primary and eternal authority (pramāṇa) in orthodox Hindu tradition. Rather than being understood as prophetic revelations dictated by a personal deity, classical systems such as Mīmāṃsā define the Vedas as apauruṣeya—uncreated, authoress, and devoid of human or divine agency. In this tradition, the ancient rishis (seers) did not compose the texts, but perceived (dṛṣṭi) the cosmic sounds and transmitted them through oral recitation. The Shruti corpus comprises the four Vedas—Rig Veda, Sama Veda, Yajur Veda, and Atharva Veda. Each Veda is subcategorized into four layers: Samhitas, Brahmanas, Aranyakas, and Upanishads.

=== Vedas ===
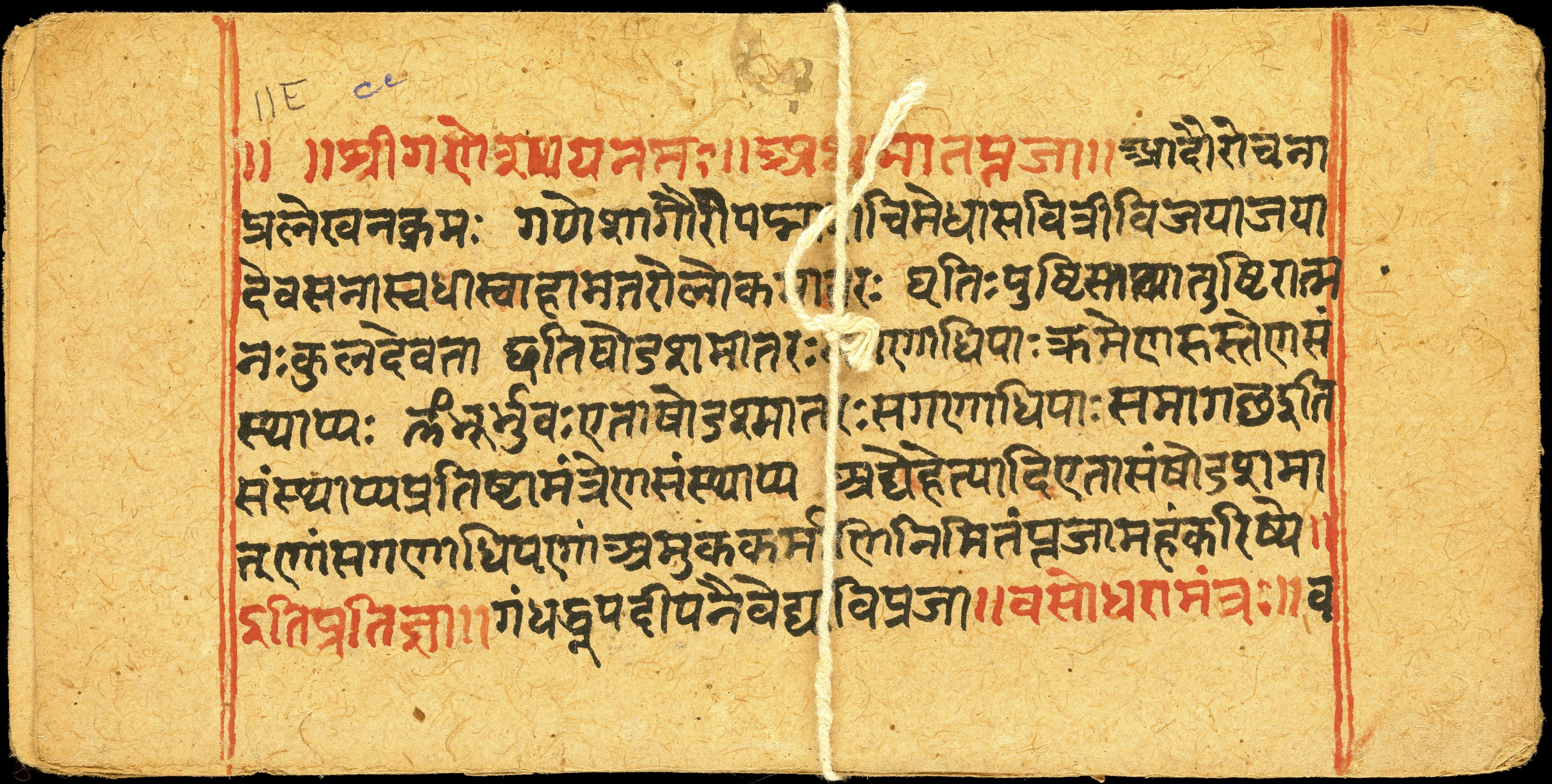
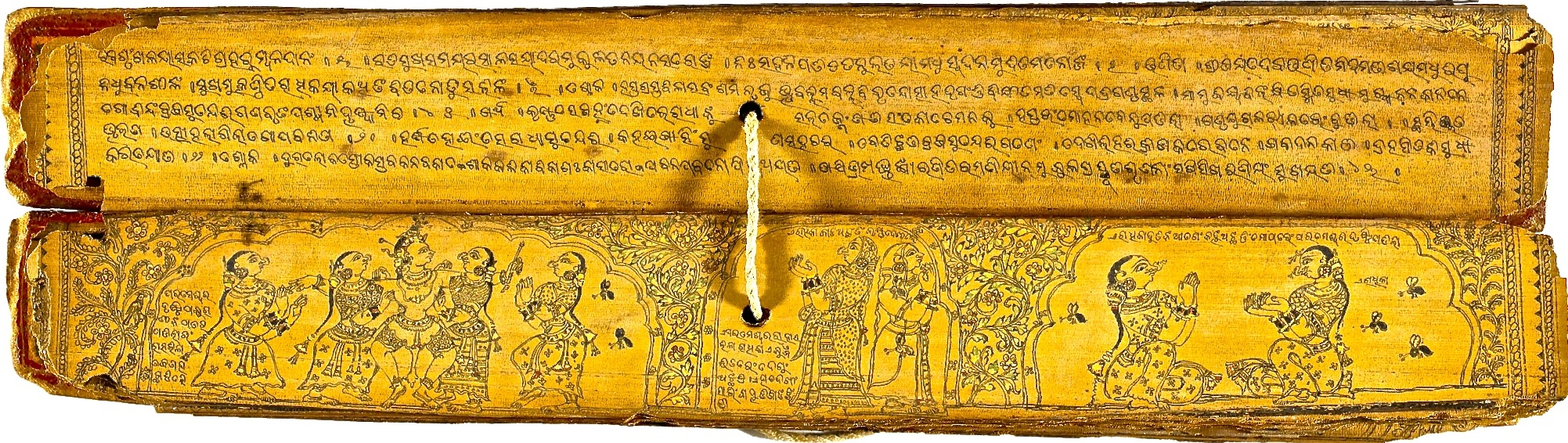
Manuscripts of 18th-century Hindu texts in Sanskrit (Devanagari) and Odia.

The four Vedas (Rig Veda, Sama Veda, Yajur Veda, and Atharva Veda) are a large body of Hindu texts originating from the Vedic period in northern India, the Rig Veda being composed c. 1200 BCE, and its Samhita and Brahmanas complete before about 800 BCE. Composed in Vedic Sanskrit hymns, the texts constitute the oldest layer of Sanskrit literature and the oldest scriptures of Hinduism. Hindus consider the Vedas to be timeless revelation, apauruṣeya, which means "not of a man, superhuman" and "impersonal, authorless". The knowledge in the Vedas is believed in Hinduism to be eternal, uncreated, neither authored by human nor by divine source, but seen, heard and transmitted by sages.

Vedas are also called shruti ("what is heard") literature, distinguishing them from other religious texts, which are called smṛti ("what is remembered"). The Vedas, for orthodox Indian theologians, are considered revelations, some way or other the work of the Deity. In the Hindu Epic the Mahabharata, the creation of Vedas is credited to the deity responsible for creation, Brahma.

Each of the four Vedas have been subclassified into four major text types:

1. the Samhitas (mantras and benedictions),
2. the Aranyakas (text on rituals, ceremonies, sacrifices and symbolic-sacrifices),
3. the Brahmanas (commentaries on rituals, ceremonies and sacrifices), and
4. the Upanishads (text discussing meditation, philosophy and spiritual knowledge).

=== Upanishads ===
The Upanishads are a collection of Hindu texts which contain the central philosophical concepts of Hinduism. (Note: These include rebirth, karma, moksha, ascetic techniques and renunciation. Olivelle (1998)) The Upanishads are the foundation of Hindu philosophical thought and its diverse traditions.

The Upanishads are commonly referred to as Vedānta, interpreted to mean either the "last chapters, parts of the Veda" or "the object, the highest purpose of the Veda". The concepts of Brahman (Ultimate Reality) and Ātman (Soul, Self) are central ideas in all the Upanishads, and "Know your Ātman" their thematic focus. The central ideas of the Upanishads have had a lasting influence on Hindu philosophy. (Note: Even though theoretically the whole of vedic corpus is accepted as revealed truth [shruti], in reality it is the Upanishads that have continued to influence the life and thought of the various religious traditions that we have come to call Hindu. Upanishads are the scriptures par excellence of Hinduism.)

More than 200 Upanishads are known, but 108 of them are in the canon. Thirteen of which are known to be the oldest and are referred to as the mukhya (main) or principal Upanishads. The thirteen mukhya Upanishads are: Isha, Kena, Katha, Prashna, Mundaka, Mandukya, Taittiriya, Aitareya, Chandogya, Brihadaranyaka., Shvetashvatara, Maitrayaniya, and Kaushitaki. However, the last three Upanishads listed are commonly left out of the primary ten because Adi Shankaracharya, an 8th-century Indian philosopher, wrote commentaries on only the ten Upanishads, which had paved the way for the primary Vedanta teaching.

The 10 mukhya Upanishads are found mostly in the concluding part of the Brahmanas and Aranyakas and were, for centuries, memorized by each generation and passed down verbally. The early Upanishads all predate the Common Era, some in all likelihood pre-Buddhist (6th century BCE), down to the Maurya period. Of the remainder, some 95 Upanishads are part of the Muktika canon, composed from about the start of common era through medieval Hinduism. New Upanishads, beyond the 108 in the Muktika canon, continued being composed through the early modern and modern era, though often dealing with subjects unconnected to Hinduism.

== Smriti ==
Smriti is the classification of literature which includes various scriptures and Itihasas (epics like the Ramayana and Mahabharata), Harivamsa Puranas, Agamas and Darshanas. This genre of texts includes the Sutras and Shastras of the six schools of Hindu philosophy: Samkhya, Yoga, Nyaya, Vaisheshika, Mimamsa and Vedanta.

The Sutras and Shastras texts were compilations of technical or specialized knowledge in a defined area. The earliest are dated to the latter half of the 1st millennium BCE. These include the Dharmashastras (law books), which are derivatives of the Dharmasutras. The Dharmasutras are part of the larger group of ritual texts known as Kalpasutras, which contain the Shrautasutras (texts on Vedic rituals), and Grhyasutras (texts on domestic rituals). Other examples are bhautikashastra "physics", rasayanashastra "chemistry", jīvashastra "biology", vastushastra "architectural science", shilpashastra "science of sculpture", arthashastra "economics" and nītishastra "political science". This group of texts also includes Tantras and Agama literature.

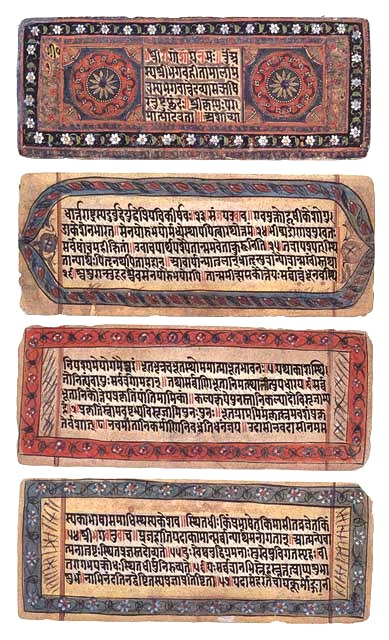
A 19th century manuscript of the Hindu text Bhagavad Gita

=== Puranas ===
The Puranas, which mean "history" or "old", are Sanskrit texts which were composed between 3rd century BCE and 1000 CE. The Puranas are a vast genre of Hindu texts that encyclopedically cover a wide range of topics, particularly legends and other traditional lore. Composed primarily in Sanskrit, but also in regional languages, several of these texts are named after major Hindu deities such as Vishnu, Shiva, and Devi.

The Puranic literature is encyclopedic, and it includes diverse topics such as cosmogony, cosmology, genealogies of gods, goddesses, kings, heroes, sages, and demigods, folk tales, pilgrimages, temples, medicine, astronomy, grammar, mineralogy, humor, love stories, as well as theology and philosophy. The content is diverse across the Puranas, and each Purana has survived in numerous manuscripts which are themselves voluminous and comprehensive. The Hindu Puranas are anonymous texts and likely the work of many authors over the centuries; in contrast, most Jaina Puranas can be dated and their authors assigned.

There are 18 Maha Puranas (Great Puranas): Agni Purana, Bhagavata Purana, Bhavishya Purana, Brahmanda Purana, Brahmavaivarta Purana, Garuda Purana, Kurma Purana, Linga Purana, Markandeya Purana, Naradiya Purana, Padma Purana, Shiva Purana, Skanda Purana, Vamana Purana, Varaha Purana, Vayu Purana, and Vishnu Purana and 18 Upa Puranas (Minor Puranas), with over 400,000 verses. Although classified as Smriti—and therefore secondary to Shruti—the Puranas are accepted as authoritative scriptures in major devotional traditions. Traditional sources, including the Chāndogya Upaniṣad (7.1.4) and the Śatapatha Brāhmaṇa, refer to Itihāsa-Purāṇa as the "fifth Veda" (pañcama veda). This gives them authoritative status for expounding Vedic philosophy in post-Vedic traditions. These Hindu texts have been influential in the Hindu culture, inspiring major national and regional annual festivals of Hinduism. The Bhagavata Purana has been among the most celebrated and popular text in the Puranic genre. The Bhagavata Purana emphasizes bhakti (devotion) towards Krishna. The Bhagavata Purana is a key text in Krishna bhakti literature.

=== Mahabharata ===
The Mahābhārata, traditionally categorized as Itihāsa (historical tradition, literally "thus indeed it was"), relates the narrative of the Bhārata dynasty. Academic scholarship generally dates the compilation of the text between the 3rd century BCE and the 4th century CE, preserving earlier oral traditions. The text probably reached its final form by the early Gupta period (c. 4th century CE). The composition is traditionally attributed to Vedavyasa and is made up of over 100,000 shlokas.

The plot of the Mahabharata covers the events of the war between two groups of cousins (the Pandavas and the Kauravas) and the aftermath of the Kurukshetra War. The Mahabharata also teaches about dharma (duty), the stories of many key figures in Hinduism, and includes the Bhagavad Gita.

The Bhagavad Gita is made up of 700 shlokas and is the discussion between Krishna and Arjuna on the battlefield before the start of the war. Krishna in the Bhagavad Gita teaches Arjuna about atma (soul), God, moksha, and dharma.

=== Ramayana ===
The Ramayana, an ancient Sanskrit text with the earliest part believed to have been composed in the 5th century BCE, is attributed to the sage Valmiki and contains over 24,000 verses.

The epic covers the life journey of Rama, an incarnation of Vishnu, along with his wife Sita, and brother Lakshmana. Central to the plot is the fourteen-year exile endured by Rama, Sita, and Lakshmana, during which Sita is abducted by Ravana of Lanka. Rama, accompanied by Lakshmana, Hanuman (a devotee of Rama), and an army, engages in a battle with Ravana, ultimately emerging victorious with Rama's slaying of Ravana. The epic concludes with Rama, Sita, and Lakshmana's return to Ayodhya, where Rama is crowned king and reigns over Ayodhya.

=== Agamas and Tantras ===
The Āgamas are a large collection of non-Vedic and Post-Vedic scriptures that govern the doctrine, temple construction, ritual practice, and theological foundations of ancient and contemporary Hinduism. Āgamas, often grouped under the broader umbrella of Tantric literature, are traditionally divided into three primary denominational classes:

- Śaiva Āgamas: 28 primary (mūla) texts and numerous secondary texts (upāgama) texts that form the practical and philosophical foundation of Śaiva Siddhānta and related traditions.
- Vaiṣṇava Saṃhitās: Consisting primarily of the Pāñcarātra and Vaikhānasa traditions, which dictate temple liturgy, image consecration (mūrtipratiṣṭhā), ritual practice, and daily worship in major Vaiṣṇava temples.
- Śākta Tantras: Texts dedicated to Devi (the Supreme Goddess), delineating ritual diagrams (yantras), mantras, yoga, and esoteric philosophy.

Wherein Vedic Śruti emphasizes on sacrificial rites (yajña), the Āgamas on the other hand are the foundational authorities for temple-based theistic worship (pūjā). In many South Indian temple traditions, the Āgamas hold canonical authority alongside the Vedas.

== Other Hindu texts ==
Hindu texts for specific fields, in Sanskrit and other regional languages, have been reviewed as follows:

Field	Reviewer	Reference
Agriculture and food	Gyula Wojtilla	
Architecture	P Acharya, B Dagens	
Devotionalism	Karen Pechelis	
Drama, dance and performance arts	AB Keith, Rachel Baumer and James Brandon, Mohan Khokar	
Education, school system	Hartmut Scharfe	
Epics	John Brockington	
Gnomic and didactic literature	Ludwik Sternbach	
Grammar	Hartmut Scharfe	
Law and jurisprudence	J Duncan M Derrett	
Lexicography	Claus Vogel	
Mathematics and exact sciences	Kim Plofker; David Pingree	
Medicine	MS Valiathan, Kenneth Zysk	
Music	Emmie te Nijenhuis, Lewis Rowell	
Mythology	Ludo Rocher	
Philosophy	Karl Potter	
Poetics	Edwin Gerow, Siegfried Lienhard	
Gender and Sex	Johann Jakob Meyer	
State craft, politics	Patrick Olivelle	
Tantrism, Agamas	Teun Goudriaan	
Temples, Sculpture	Stella Kramrisch	
Scriptures (Vedas and Upanishads)	Jan Gonda	

== Historical significance ==
The Hindu scriptures provide the early documented history of arts and science forms in India such as music, dance, sculptures, architecture, astronomy, science, mathematics, medicine and wellness. Valmiki's Ramayana (500 BCE to 100 BCE) mentions music and singing by Gandharvas, dance by Apsaras such as Urvashi, Rambha, Menaka, Tilottama Panchāpsaras, and by Ravana's wives who excelling in nrityageeta or "singing and dancing" and nritavaditra or "playing musical instruments"). The evidence of earliest dance related texts are in Natasutras, which are mentioned in the text of Panini, the sage who wrote the classic on Sanskrit grammar, and who is dated to about 500 BCE. This performance arts related Sutra text is mentioned in other late Vedic texts, as are two scholars names Shilalin (IAST: Śilālin) and Krishashva (Kṛśaśva), credited to be pioneers in the studies of ancient drama, singing, dance and Sanskrit compositions for these arts. Richmond et al. estimate the Natasutras to have been composed around 600 BCE, whose complete manuscript has not survived into the modern age.

== See also ==
- Hindu cosmology and eschatology
- Hindu tantric literature
- Indian epic poetry
- List of Hindu texts
  - Atharvaveda
  - Rigveda
  - Samaveda
  - Yajurveda
- List of historic Indian texts
- Prasthanatrayi
- Sanskrit literature
- Sanskrit-related topics
- Timeline of Hindu texts
