= Kandhanathaswamy thirukovil =

Temple in Tamil Nadu, India

Kandhanathaswamy temple, also known as Adhi Swaminathaswamy Thirukovil, is a temple located in the village of Eragaram near Kumbakonam in Tamil Nadu. This temple is a Sivan temple although it has Murugan as the primary deity. This temple is older than the Swaminatha Swamy Temple.

== Location ==
This place is located in Eraharam. This temple can be reached by the roads from Thiruppurambiyam and from Kumbakonam. The temple has river Palar, a tributary of river Kaveri, running along the back side of the temple, and has a temple pond at its side. Parking facilities are also available for visitors.

== Naming ==
Rishis were often being attacked by the demons. So the Rishis went to Lord Shiva asking help. Lord Shiva told his son Murugan to help them, and also gave Murugan a weapon and instructed Murugan to hold that place. That weapon had fallen to the earth in this particular place, which gave rise to the name Eraharam.

== Specality ==
This place exists since before 9th century as this place has been sung by Nakkiranar, Kachiayappar sivachariyar and Arungirinathar

This place is mentioned in the books wrote by them. Also this place is mentioned in the Kandha Shasti kavasam written by Devaraya Swamigal

== Kumbhabhishekham ==
Kumbhabhishekham to this temple had been done on 12 September 1982 and also on 19 March 2015.

== Festivals ==
The festivals here are in Karthigai month and in Panguni Uthiram
