= List of Tamil literature works about Ganesha =

This is a list of some Tamil literature which is dedicated to the Hindu god Ganesha. The list is grouped historically.

- Vinayagar Agaval - by Avvaiyaar
- Tirunaraiyur Vinayaka Tiru irattai manimalai by Nambiyandar Nambi (c. 10th century AD)
- Aludaya Pillaiyar Tiruvantadi by Nambiyandar Nambi (c. 10th century AD)
- Aludaya Pillaiyar Tiruchabai viruttam by Nambiyandar Nambi (c. 10th century AD)
- Aludaya Pillaiyar Mummanikovai by Nambiyandar Nambi (c. 10th century AD)
- Aludaya Pillaiyar Tiruvulamalai by Nambiyandar Nambi (c. 10th century AD)
- Aludaya Pillaiyar Tirukkalambakam by Nambiyandar Nambi (c. 10th century AD)
- Aludaya Pillaiyar Tiruttogai by Nambiyandar Nambi (c. 10th century AD)
