= Dharmabhrit =

Characters in the Ramayana

Within Hinduism, Dharmabhrit (Sanskrit dharmabhṛt) is one of the anchorites who accompanied Rama from Sutīkṣṇa's hermitage on his journey through the Dandaka forest. He tells the story of sage Māṇḍakarṇi on the bank of Panchāpsaras, when asked by Rama about the origin of wondrous music coming from unknown source.
