= Avvaiyar (8th-century poet) =

Tamil Poet

Avvaiyar (Tamil: ஔவையார்) was a Tamil poet who lived during the seventh or eighth century and was a follower of the poet-saint Sundarar. She was the author of Vinayagar Agaval, a devotional poetic hymn to the Hindu deity Ganesha. The name Avvaiyar in Tamil is defined as a respectable good woman and was considered an honorific. Her given name is not known.
