= Māṇḍakarṇi =

Sage in Hinduism

Māṇḍakarṇi (Sanskrit माण्डकर्णि) is a sage mentioned in book III (Aranya Kanda) of the Ramayana. His story is told to Rama by Sage Dharmabhrit during the prince's journey through the Dandaka forest, when Rama, standing on the bank of the forest lake, asks about the origin of wondrous music coming from an unknown source.

== Legend ==
Māṇḍakarṇi is said to have performed austere rites by staying in a stream and feeding on nothing but air for ten thousand years. Through these rites he gained great power, which alarmed the devas. Frightened by his tapas, they sent five lovely apsaras to beguile him and seduce him from his vows. They succeeded in their mission, and became bound to Māṇḍakarṇi as his wives. Through his holy power, he created a wondrous palace under the lake for the heavenly dames to enjoy. The lake is called Panchāpsaras ([the lake of] five apsaras). When wanderers come to the bank of the lake, they sometimes hear heavenly strains and charming music coming from beneath the water. This, Ramayana tells, is the sound of apsaras playing with their zones and bracelets for Māṇḍakarṇi's pleasure, who also restored his youth through his exceptional penance.
