= Suzane George =

Indian actress

- Born: Susan George Matthan; July 28, 1987 (age 39); Thiruvananthapuram, India
- Occupation: Actress
- Years active: 2007–present

Suzane George (born 25 July 1987) is an Indian actress who works mainly in Tamil films and television.

== Career ==
=== Television ===
Her first break in television was with Jaya TV as a VJ: she hosted the show Thagaval Dot Com in Kalai Malar. Her first serial was Khakki. She has played a variety of roles, ranging from an auto driver in the serial Thendral to an IT project manager in Office. She won 4th place in a cooking reality show Kitchen SuperStar of Star Vijay. She was also a finalist of the show 60 Nodi, Are you ready?.

== Filmography ==
Year	Film	Role	Notes
2008	Arasangam	Insurance sales agent	
2008	Silandhi		Uncredited role
2010	Mynaa	Sudha Bhaskar (Jailer's wife)	
2010	Arjunan Kadhali		Unreleased Film
2011	Narthagi	Transgender's mother	
2013	Raa Raa	Pushpa	
2013	Desingu Raja		
2013	Pechiyakka Marumagan		
2014	Devdas Style Marchadu		Telugu film
2014	Nanbenda	Ramya's hostel mate	
2018	Thodraa	Pounraj's wife	
2018	Ratsasan	ACP Lakshmi	
2019	Rakshasudu	ACP Lakshmi	Telugu film
2019	Jackpot	Jail warden	
2021	Anandham Vilayadum Veedu	Vairam, Muthupandi's wife	
2023	Erumbu	Kamalam	
2025	Poorveegam		
2025	Kumki 2	Bhoomi's mother	

=== Television ===
Year	Serial	Role	Channel
2009	Suzhiyam		Star Vijay
2009–2010	Roja Kootam		Star Vijay
2009–2013	Thendral	Kalyani	Sun TV
2011-2012	Athipookal	Mary "Kanagam"	Sun TV
2012-2013	Thiyagam	Suganthi	Sun TV
2012-2013	Saravanan Meenatchi	Mallika "Maggi"	Star Vijay
2013	60 Nodi! Are You Ready?	herself	Star Vijay
2013-2014	Office	Susan	Star Vijay
2015–2016	7aam Uyir		Vendhar TV
2015–2016	Andal Azhagar/ Pagal Nilavu	Malarvizhi	Star Vijay
2016–2018	Saravanan Meenatchi	Radhika	Star Vijay
2016-2017	Kakka Kakka		Raj TV
