= Eraharam =

Eraharam Eragaram
- village
- Country: India
- State: Tamil Nadu
- District: Thanjavur

Population (2001)
  - Total: 1,930

Languages
  - Official: Tamil
- Time zone: UTC+5:30 (IST)
- Postal codes: 612002,612303

Eraharam is a village in Kumbakonam taluk, Thanjavur district, Tamil Nadu. It is locally known as Eragaram. It has an old Murugan temple known as Kandhanathaswamy thirukovil. The residents' main occupations are agriculture and fishing.

The water resources are ground water, tap water, canal water and water from Chakara Pond. There is a bus stop, but few road connections to the village. The population of the village shrank from 1930 (2001 census) to 1222 in the 2011 census. In the 2001 census, Eraharam had 924 males and 1006 females. The sex ratio was 1089 and the literacy rate, 70.16. In this village there are many temples too. Some of them are:

- Unnathapureshwarar kovil
- Kandhanathaswamy thirukovil
- Eraharam Bala Sastha Aalayam

== Temples ==
There are many temples in this village, the murugan temple in this village is the adhi temple for swami malai murugan temple Kandhanathaswamy thirukovil

And there is a vinayagar temple and a sivan temple also known as Unnathapureshwarar kovil

== Transportation and Routes ==
This village has roads which connects this village to the neighbouring city Kumbakonam, and the villages of Innambur and thirupurambiyam. Buses also are available to this village. The nearest railway station is kumbakonam railway station and the nearest airport is Trichy International Airport.
