= 7aam Uyir =

Tamil language television series

- Genre: Soap opera
- Written by: Jayakrishnan
- Directed by: Azhagar
- Starring: Lakshmi; Suzane
- Country of origin: India
- Original language: Tamil
- No. of seasons: 1
- No. of episodes: 210

Production
- Producer: D.A. Vasudevan
- Camera setup: Multi-camera
- Running time: approx. 20-22 minutes per episode

Original release
- Network: Vendhar TV
- Release: 1 June 2015 – 31 March 2016

7aam Uyir is a 2015 Tamil-language thriller soap opera starring Lakshmi, Suzane, Sowpna, Azhagar and Sarath. It aired from Monday through Friday on Vendhar TV from 1 June 2015 to 31 March 2016 at 7:00PM and 9:00PM (IST) for 210 episodes. It was directed by Azhagar.

== Plot ==
It is the story of seven young girls who are about to be haunted by some unknown spirit.

== Cast ==
=== Main cast ===
- Suzane
- Sowpna
- Lakshmi

=== Supporting cast ===
- Azhagar
- Venkadesh
- Sarath
- Manikkarajan
- Murugan
- Supramani
- Ravi
- Jeeva
- Deepa
- Aiyappan
- Stylin Varnaa
- Indhu
- Sri Vithiya Nayar
- Sharmi
- Suresh
- Ramnath
