= Kakka Kakka =

- Genre: Soap opera
- Written by: Jaya Krishnan
- Directed by: Azhagar
- Starring: Deepa; Jeeva Ravi; Suzane George; Kamal; SVS Kumar
- Country of origin: India
- Original language: Tamil
- No. of seasons: 1
- No. of episodes: 127

Production
- Producer: Ajay Kirushna
- Camera setup: Multi-camera
- Running time: approx. 20-22 minutes per episode Monday to Friday; 6:30PM IST
- Production company: Di film corporation

Original release
- Network: Raj TV
- Release: 7 September 2016 – 10 February 2017

Kakka Kakka is an Indian soap opera starring Deepa, Jeeva Ravi, Suzane George, Kamal and SVS Kumar. It aired Monday to Friday at 6:30PM IST on Raj TV from 7 September 2016 to 10 January 2017 for 127 episodes. The title song of the serial is sung by the famous Playback Singer and Carnatic Music senior Vocalist Dr. Nithyasree Mahadevan. It had been receiving the highest ratings of Tamil serials and received praising from viewers.

== Cast ==
- Deepa Jayan
- Jeeva Ravi
- Suzane George
- Kamal
- SVS Kumar
- Bharathy Mokan
- Saravanan
- Dharaj
- Poorni
- Yasotha
- Jerad Noel
- Jayashila
- Sabitha Raj
- Akil
- CD
- Kishan

== Original soundtrack ==
=== Title song ===
It was written by lyricist DR. Kiruthika, composed by the music director Hari Krushna. The title song of the serial is sung by the Playback Singer and Carnatic Music senior Vocalist Dr. Nithyasree Mahadevan.

=== Soundtrack ===
Track listing
No.	Title	Lyrics	Singer(s)	Length
1.	"Veera Vel Sura Vel (வீர வேல் சுர வேல்)"	DR. Kiruthika	Nithyasree Mahadevan	3:30

== Filming ==
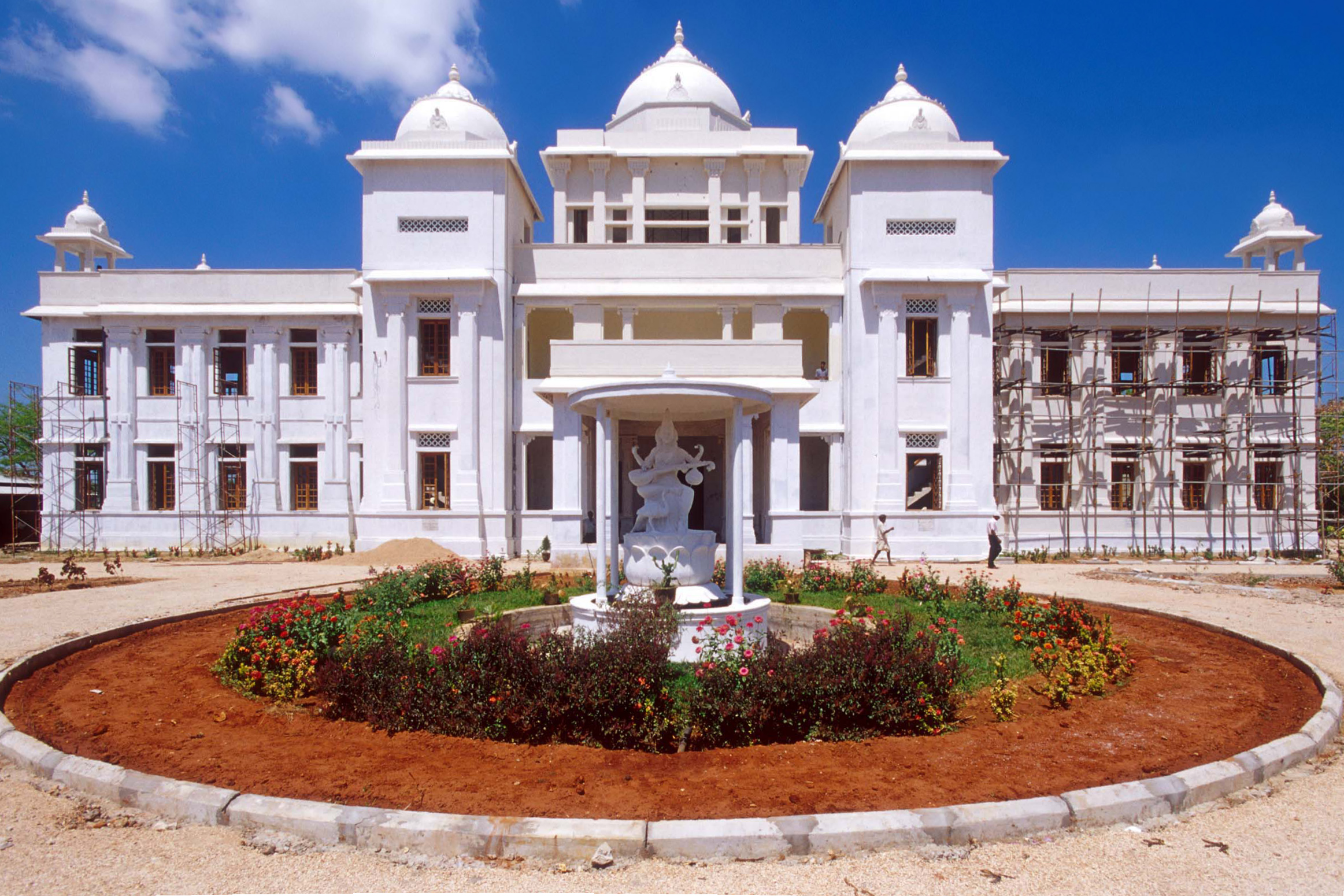
Jaffna Public Library

The first schedule of filming was held in Sri Lanka (Bandaranaike International Airport, Colombo, Kataragama temple, Kataragama temple, Selva Sannidhi Murugan Temple, Burning of Jaffna library, Burning of Jaffna library, Maruthanamadam Anjaneyar Temple).

The Second schedule of filming was held in Tamil Nadu (Thiruchendur, Thiruchendur Murugan Temple and Palani).

== See also ==
- Kanda Shasti Kavasam
