= Athichudi =

Collection of quotations by Avvaiyar

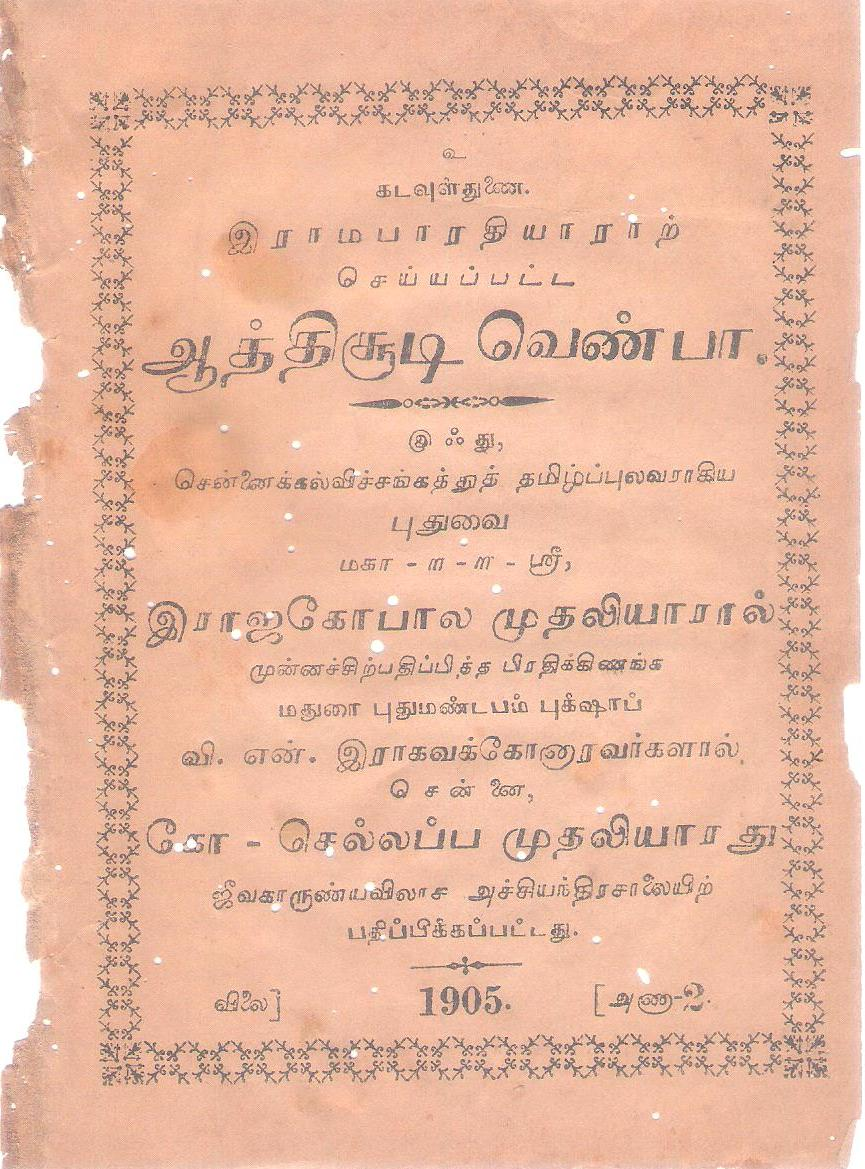
Athichudi Venpa

The Athichudi (Tamil: ஆத்திசூடி, romanized: Āthichūdi) is a collection of single-line quotations written by Avvaiyar and organized in alphabetical order. There are 109 of these sacred lines which include insightful quotes expressed in simple words. It aims to inculcate good habits, discipline and doing good deeds.

== Translations ==
English translation of உயிர் வருக்கம்

தமிழ் எழுத்து	தமிழ் வாக்கியம்	English Translation
அ	அறம் செய்ய விரும்பு	Intend to do the right deeds.
ஆ	ஆறுவது சினம்	The nature of anger is to subside.
இ	இயல்வது கரவேல்	Help others as much as you can.
ஈ	ஈவது விலக்கேல்	Do not stop or avoid charitable deeds.
உ	உடையது விளம்பேல்	Do not brag about your possessions.
ஊ	ஊக்கமது கைவிடேல்	Never lose hope or motivation.
எ	எண் எழுத்து இகழேல்	Do not despise numbers and letters.
ஏ	ஏற்பது இகழ்ச்சி	Do not beg.
ஐ	ஐயமிட்டு உண்	Eat after offering alms.
ஒ	ஒப்புரவு ஒழுகு	Adapt to your changing world.
ஓ	ஓதுவது ஒழியேல்	Never stop learning.
ஒள	ஒளவியம் பேசேல்	Do not speak ill about others.
ஃ	ஃகஞ் சுருக்கேல்	Do not hamper development or creativity.

English translation of உயிர்மெய் வருக்கம்

தமிழ் எழுத்து	தமிழ் வாக்கியம்	English Translation
க	கண்டொன்று சொல்லேல்	Do not see one and say another.
ங	ஙப் போல் வளை	Bend like the letter ங.
ச	சனி நீராடு	Ablute on Saturdays.
ஞ	ஞயம்பட உரை	Sweeten your speech.
ட	இடம்பட வீடு எடேல்	Judiciously space your home.
ண	இணக்கம் அறிந்து இணங்கு	Befriend the best.
த	தந்தை தாய்ப் பேண்	Protect your parents.
ந	நன்றி மறவேல்	Don't forget gratitude.
ப	பருவத்தே பயிர் செய்	Sow during the season.
ம	மண் பறித்து உண்ணேல்	Don't grab land.
ய	இயல்பு அலாதன செய்யேல்	Desist demeaning deeds.
ர	அரவம் ஆட்டேல்	Don't play with snakes.
ல	இலவம் பஞ்சில் துயில்	Sleep on a silk cotton bed.
வ	வஞ்சகம் பேசேல்	Don't wile.
ழ	அழகு அலாதன செய்யேல்	Do not do ugly deeds.
ள	இளமையில் கல்	Learn when young.
ற	அறனை மறவேல்	Never forget your moral duty.
ன	அனந்தல் ஆடேல்	Oversleeping is obnoxious.

(க-கௌ) English translation of ககர வருக்கம்

தமிழ் எழுத்து	தமிழ் வாக்கியம்	English Translation
க	கடிவது மற	Forget scolding others.
கா	காப்பது விரதம்	Preservation is equal to fasting.
கி	கிழமைப்பட வாழ்	Live according to days.
கீ	கீழ்மை அகற்று	Remove poverty.
கு	குணமது கைவிடேல்	Don't lose character.
கூ	கூடிப் பிரியேல்	Don't forsake friends.
கெ	கெடுப்பது ஒழி	Abandon animosity.
கே	கேள்வி முயல்	Learn by asking questions.
கை	கைவினை கரவேல்	Learn handicraft.
கொ	கொள்ளை விரும்பேல்	Don't swindle.
கோ	கோதாட்டு ஒழி	Ban hurtful games.
கெள	கெளவை அகற்று	Avoid gossiping.

ச சௌ English translation of சகர வருக்கம்

தமிழ் எழுத்து	தமிழ் வாக்கியம்	English Translation
ச	சக்கர நெறி நில்	Obey the laws of the land.
சா	சான்றோர் இனத்து இரு	Associate with the noble.
சி	சித்திரம் பேசேல்	Stop exaggeration.
சீ	சீர்மை மறவேல்	Remember to be righteous.
சு	சுளிக்கச் சொல்லேல்	Don't hurt others feelings.
சூ	சூது விரும்பேல்	Don't gamble.
செ	செய்வன திருந்தச் செய்	Act your best.
சே	சேரிடம் அறிந்து சேர்	Seek out good friends.
சை	சையெனத் திரியேல்	Avoid being insulted.
சொ	சொற் சோர்வு படேல்	Don't show fatigue in conversation.
சோ	சோம்பித் திரியேல்	Don't be lazy.

த தோ English translation of தகர வருக்கம்

தமிழ் எழுத்து	தமிழ் வாக்கியம்	English Translation
த	தக்கோன் எனத் திரி	Be trustworthy.
தா	தானமது விரும்பு	Be kind to the unfortunate.
தி	திருமாலுக்கு அடிமை செய்	Serve Tirumal.
தீ	தீவினை அகற்று	Don't sin.
து	துன்பத்திற்கு இடம் கொடேல்	Don't attract suffering.
தூ	தூக்கி வினை செய்	Deliberate every action.
தெ	தெய்வம் இகழேல்	Don't defame the divine.
தே	தேசத்தோடு ஒட்டி வாழ்	Live in unison with your countrymen.
தை	தையல் சொல் கேளேல்	Don't listen to malicious speech.
தொ	தொன்மை மறவேல்	Don't forget the past.
தோ	தோற்பன தொடரேல்	Don't compete if defeat is certain.

ந நோ English translation of நகர வருக்கம்

தமிழ் எழுத்து	தமிழ் வாக்கியம்	English Translation
ந	நன்மை கடைப்பிடி	Adhere to the beneficial.
நா	நாடு ஒப்பன செய்	Do what is acceptable to the nation.
நி	நிலையில் பிரியேல்	Don't depart from good standing.
நீ	நீர் விளையாடேல்	Don't jump into a watery grave.
நு	நுண்மை நுகரேல்	Don't oversnack.
நூ	நூல் பல கல்	Read lot of books.
நெ	நெற்பயிர் விளைவு செய்	Engage in agriculture.
நே	நேர்பட ஒழுகு	Exhibit good manners always.
நை	நைவினை நணுகேல்	Don't involve in destruction.
நொ	நொய்ய உரையேல்	Avoid the profane.
நோ	நோய்க்கு இடம் கொடேல்	Avoid unhealthy lifestyles.

ப போ English translation of பகர வருக்கம்

தமிழ் எழுத்து	தமிழ் வாக்கியம்	English Translation
ப	பழிப்பன பகரேல்	Speak no vulgarity.
பா	பாம்பொடு பழகேல்	Keep away from the vicious.
பி	பிழைபடச் சொல்லேல்	Watch out for self-incrimination.
பீ	பீடு பெற நில்	Follow the path of honour.
பு	புகழ்ந்தாரைப் போற்றி வாழ்	Protect your benefactor.
பூ	பூமி திருத்தி உண்	Cultivate the land and feed.
பெ	பெரியாரைத் துணைக் கொள்	Seek help from the old and wise.
பே	பேதைமை அகற்று	Eradicate ignorance.
பை	பையலோடு இணங்கேல்	Avoid friendships with idiots.
பொ	பொருள்தனைப் போற்றி வாழ்	Protect and enhance your wealth.
போ	போர்த் தொழில் புரியேல்	Don't engage in fruitless fights.

ம மோ English translation of மகர வருக்கம்

தமிழ் எழுத்து	தமிழ் வாக்கியம்	English Translation
ம	மனம் தடுமாறேல்	Don't vacillate.
மா	மாற்றானுக்கு இடம் கொடேல்	Don't accommodate your enemy.
மி	மிகைபடச் சொல்லேல்	Don't overdramatize.
மீ	மீதூண் விரும்பேல்	Don't be a glutton.
மு	முனைமுகத்து நில்லேல்	Don't join an unjust fight.
மூ	மூர்க்கரோடு இணங்கேல்	Don't agree with the stubborn.
மெ	மெல்லி நல்லாள் தோள்சேர்	Stick with your exemplary wife.
மே	மேன்மக்கள் சொல் கேள்	Listen to the great legends.
மை	மை விழியார் மனை அகல்	Dissociate from the jealous.
மொ	மொழிவது அற மொழி	Speak with clarity.
மோ	மோகத்தை முனி	Hate any desire for lust.

வ வோ English translation of வகர வருக்கம் Sorry, we can not do வகர.
