= Avvaiyar (12th-century poet) =

Tamil Poet

Avvaiyar was a Tamil poet who lived contemporaneous to Kambar and Ottakoothar, during the reign of the Chola dynasty in the 12th century in present-day Tamil Nadu, India. She is often imagined as an old and intelligent lady by Tamil people. Many poems and the Avvai Kural, comprising 310 verses in 31 chapters, is credited to her. She is known for her Tamil language didactic poetry Aathichoodi, Kondrai Vendhan, Nalvazhi and Moodhurai.

The name Avvaiyar in Tamil is defined as a respectable good woman and was considered an honorific. Her given name is not known.

== Biography ==
Avvaiyar was the court poet of the Chola monarch and was a contemporary of Kambar and Ottakkuttar. S

=== Quotes ===
The following quotes from Aathichoodi illustrate the simplicity of her style and profoundness of the messages:

Uyir Ezhuthu	ஆத்திசூடி	English translation
அ	அறம் செய விரும்பு	Intend to do right things
ஆ	ஆறுவது சினம்	Anger is momentary; do not take decisions during times of anger (in haste)
இ	இயல்வது கரவேல்	Help others based on your capacity
ஈ	ஈவது விலக்கேல்	Never stop aiding
உ	உடையது விளம்பேல்	Never boast possessions (wealth, skills, or knowledge)
ஊ	ஊக்கமது கைவிடேல்	Never lose hope or motivation
எ	எண் எழுத்து இகழேல்	Never degrade learning
ஏ	ஏற்பது இகழ்ச்சி	Begging is shameful
ஐ	ஐயமிட்டு உண்	Share what you eat
ஒ	ஒப்புர வொழுகு	Be virtuous
ஓ	ஓதுவது ஒழியேல்	Never stop learning or reading
ஒள	ஒளவியம் பேசேல்	Never gossip
ஃ	அஃகஞ் சுருக்கேல்	Never compromise in food grains
	'anuvai thulaithezh kadalai pugatti Kuruga tharitha kural'	Thirukkural is as powerful as the energy of the seven large oceans compressed into a divided atom.

"Thol Ulagil Nallaar Oruvar Ularael Avar Poruttu Ellarkum Peiyum Mazhai" – The rain falls on behalf of the virtuous, benefitting everyone in the world.

"Nandri Oruvarukku Seithakkal An Nandri Endru tharum kol ena vaenda nindru Thalara valar thengu Thaanunda Neerai Thalaiyaalae Thaan Tharuthalal" -Don't wait for a return benefit as to when a good deed done will pay back, but be just like that tall and erect coconut tree that drank water from its feet gives the benefit of giving that sweet water by its head."

== Translation into English ==
In 2009, Red Hen Press published a selection of Avvaiyar's poetry from the twelfth century, entitled Give, Eat, and Live: Poems by Avviyar. The poems were selected and translated into English by Thomas Pruiksma, a poet and translator who learnt of Avviyar's work while on a Fulbright scholarship at The American College in Madurai, Tamil Nadu, India.

== Literary tribute ==
Letitia Elizabeth Landon pays tribute to Avvaiyar in her poem "Hindoo Temples and Palace at Madura" in Fisher's Drawing Room Scrap Book, 1836.

== See also ==
- Aathichoodi
- Abithana Chintamani
- Thiruvalluvar
- Thirukural
