= Shiva Swarodaya =

Ancient Sanskrit tantric text

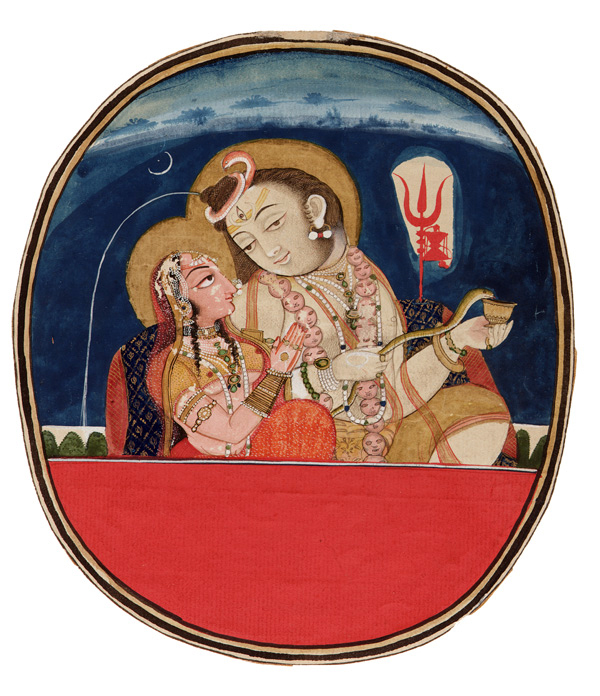
Shiva with Parvati

Shiva Swarodaya is an ancient Sanskrit tantric text. A comment and translation termed as swara yoga has been made by Satyananda Saraswati in 1983. It is also termed "Phonetical astrology": the "sound of one's own breath" and is written as a conversation between Shiva and Parvati. This ancient scripture has 395 sutras.

== Introduction ==
The script starts with the conversation between Parvati and Shiva, where Shiva starts introducing the scripts and explaining about the need for maintaining secrecy and also stating the astrological value of the text.

Its fundamental application is to realize the breath as being the medium of cosmic life force, through practising "Swara Yoga" (special mode of analysis & practising of breath). According to Mukti Bodhananda, the book enables us to understand nature of breath and its influence on the body as different modes of breathing leads to different types of actions; physical, mental and spiritual. Guruji Prem Nirmal says Swara yoga is an ancient science that correlates the breath with the sun, moon and the five elements, helping us to control moods, heal ailments and be attuned to the cosmic rhythm.

== Introduction to swaras and their effects ==
According to Mukti Bodhananda, the second part introduces types of swaras arising out of Nadis, here three kind of swaras are said to be present. and each results of swaras are also noted here. Swarodaya Yoga has three types of breathing systems - Ida (Inhaling & exhaling from our left side of the nostrils), Pingala (inhaling & exhaling from our right side of the nostrils) and Sushmana (inhaling & exhaling from both sides of the nostrils). We mostly breathe in & out from either Ida or Pingala but sometimes we breathe from both the nostrils Nadis.

Vata, Pitta and Kapha Doshas (imbalance) cause diseases and these can be balanced through Swara Yoga.

== Recommended deeds during particular flow of swaras ==
Satyananda Saraswati implies each of the swaras mentioned in the book are suitable for very specific matching activities.

There are three modes of breathing, viz, flow from left nostril, flow from right nostril & flow from both the nostrils. The last mode is generally for a short duration when breathing switches from left to right & vice versa. Mode of breathing can be checked by examining air flow while exhaling. All our actions can be classified into three main categories; physical, mental and spiritual; which are respectively presided by the above three modes of breathing.

Following are some of the specific activities which should be initiated when left or right nostrils are active. Some activities are listed under both the modes, which the aspirant may select based on the functional / piousness of the activity. In general for pious activities are initiated during currency of left nostril. One must change mode of breathing suitably at the time of initiating specific desired activity. When breath is flowing from both the nostrils, the time is beneficial for worshipping & devotional activities only; all other activities must not be then initiated. Most of the practicing astrologers have observed that compliance to the dictums of 'Swar Shaastras' is more efficacious than omens, and even a suitable time selected through astrology.

Activities recommended during running of left nostril:

It is beneficial / auspicious in initiating long distance travels; charity; donation; wearing of clothes and ornaments; treaty and agreement; installation of Murti; practicing Yoga; oblation of fire for peace; worshipping; recitation of holy books; initiation of Mantras; leaning of futurity knowledge; marriage; administering of medicine, treating of difficult illness, removing poison; starting of education-singing-dancing-playing musical instruments; discussion on dance - drama; stationary and fixed works; mental and creative works; entering into house - city - village; coronation, seeing king (high official, master, employer); sweet and friendly activities, making friends; women to participate in sexual relations; auspicious deeds; teachings; collection of domestic items - wealth and grains; purchase of jewelry; starting of water tank-pond-well; peaceful and developmental works; trade (give and take by the hand presenting the mode of breathing); agriculture works, sowing seeds, buying agricultural land, drinking water.

Activities recommended during running of right nostril:

Currency of breathing through right nostril is auspicious / beneficial for performing accurate & difficult / hard works; writing alphabets; learning and practicing use of arms and weapons; destruction of enemy war, attack, encounter; enmity; inflicting punishment; breaking / splitting; gambling; bathing; taking food; sleeping; sex by male, visiting women & prostitutes, enchanting females, attracting others; creating fear, cruel works; short distance travel; entry into house; boarding ship / big boat; drinking intoxicants, administration of poison, removal of poison; usage of Mantras; study of holy books; study & teaching of difficult & destructive branches of knowledge climbing mountains & forts; risky and heroic feats; riding on horse / elephant and transports; physical exercise; sale of animals; agriculture; crossing pond-river; taking medicine; giving donations; sale-purchase; grinding of bricks-stones-wood-metals; conduction of 'Six-Works': "beating, charming, hindering, enmity, vexing & subduing".

== Signs of forthcoming death ==
At the end of the book, the scripture deals with signs of forthcoming death stating of behaviour of swaras in body and of dreams.

== Ashrams in India teaching Swara yoga ==
- Swara Yoga Peeth https://swarayoga.org/
- Bihar School of Yoga
