= Vinayagar Agaval =

Devotional poetic hymn to the Hindu deity Ganesha

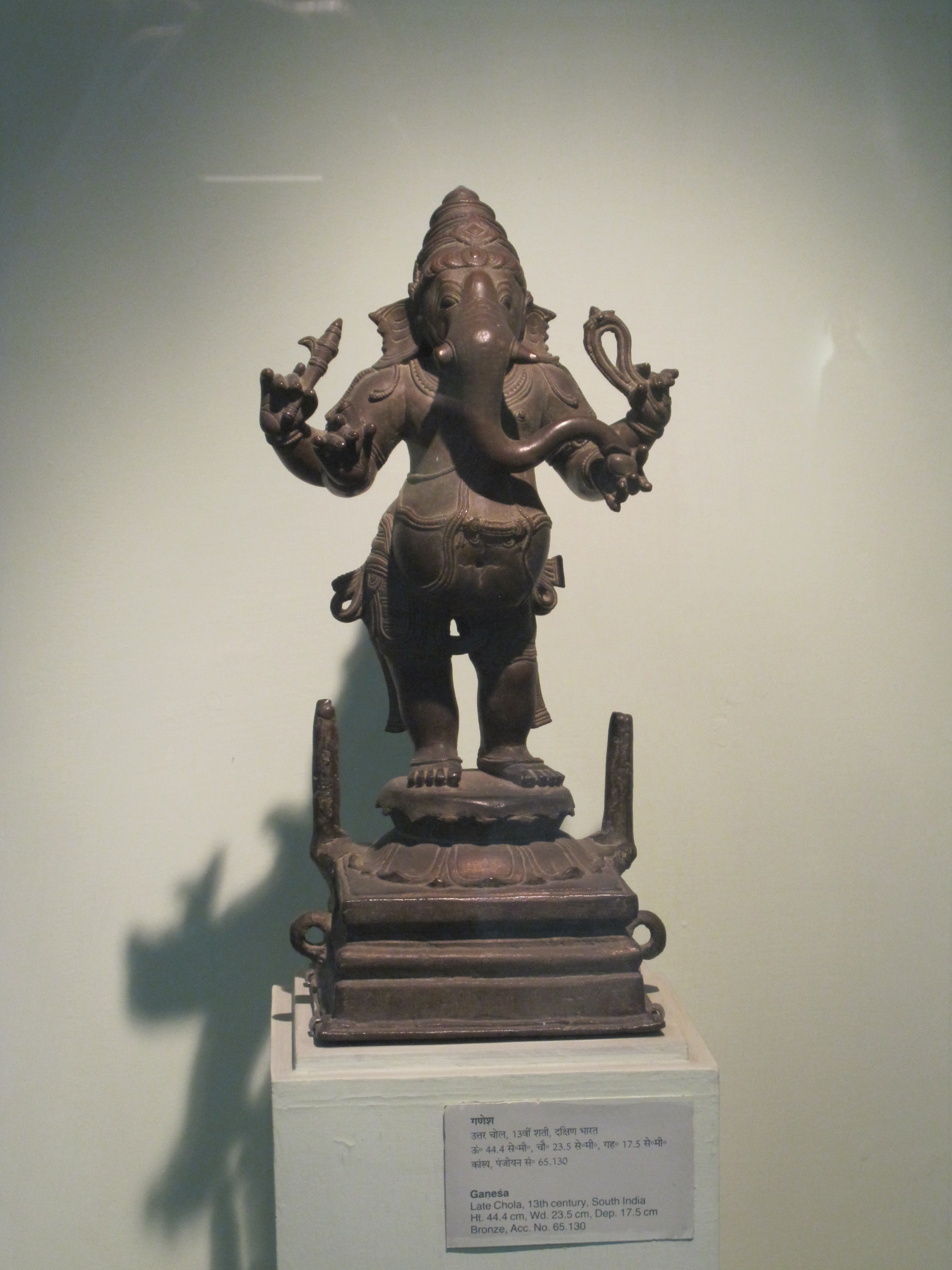
13th-century Ganesha bronze. Late Chola, Tamil Nadu

Vinayagar Agaval is a devotional poetic hymn to the Hindu deity Ganesha. It was written in the 10th century during the Chola dynasty by the Tamil poet Avvaiyar, shortly before her death. It is considered to be her greatest poem. The 72-line 'Agaval' is a form of blank verse, close to speech.

Vinayagar Agaval defines a religious path, part of the Tamil devotional tradition of Bhakti, within the Hindu philosophy of the Shaivite sect. Its application as a spiritual tool begins during concentration on a physical image of Ganesha and continues with the use of the Agaval's description of Hindu spiritual belief and practice, and aspects of the teachings on human life attributed to the deity.

சீதக்களபச் செந்தாமரைப் பூம்

பாதச்சிலம்பு பலவிசை பாட

பொன்னரை ஞாணும் பூந்துகில் ஆடையும்

வன்ன மருங்கில் வளர்ந்தழகெரிப்பப்

seedhakkaLapach chendhaamaraip poom

paadhachchilampu palavisai paata

ponnarai gnaaNum poondhukil aataiyum

vanna marungil vaLarndhazhakerippap

meaning is, the Lotus feet of Ganesha having the color of red lotus, and which is besmeared with cool sandal is adorned by anklets, sings various songs.golden waist belt and his clothes as soft as flower shine like beautiful colors in the rainbow.

According to Chandrasekarendra Swamigal, a person reciting the Vinayagar Agaval every day will realize highest wisdom.

== Full Text ==
The full text of the Vinayagar Agaval published in Maalai Malar. Since this text is from 10th century CE, it is not governed by any copyright law. Vinayagar Agaval consists of 120 verses written in Tamil, each verse carefully crafted to convey deep spiritual truths. The hymn beautifully describes the form and attributes of Lord Ganesha, exalting his divine qualities and significance. The verses also reflect upon the nature of human existence, the challenges faced on the spiritual path, and the ultimate goal of attaining liberation from worldly attachments.

=== Lyrics in Tamil ===
சீதக் களபச் செந்தா மரைப்பூம்

பாதச் சிலம்பு பலஇசை பாட

பொன்னரை ஞாணும் பூந்துகில் ஆடையும்

வன்ன மருங்கில் வளர்ந்தழ(கு) எறிப்ப

பேழை வயிறும் பெரும்பாரக் கோடும்

வேழ முகமும் விளங்குசிந் தூரமும்

அஞ்சு கரமும் அங்குச பாசமும்

நெஞ்சில் குடிகொண்ட நீல மேனியும்

நான்ற வாயும் நாலிரு புயமும்

மூன்று கண்ணும் மும்மதச் சுவடும்

இரண்டு செவியும் இலங்குபொன் முடியும்

திரண்டமுப் புரிநூல் திகழ்ஒளி மார்பும்

சொற்பதம் கடந்த துரியமெய்ஞ் ஞான

அற்புதம் நின்ற கற்பக் களிறே!

முப்பழம் நுகரும் மூஷிக வாகன

இப்பொழுது என்னை ஆட்கொள வேண்டித்

தாயாய் எனக்குத் தானெழுந்(து) அருளி

மாயாப் பிறவி மயக்கம் அறுத்துத்

திருந்திய முதல்ஐந் தெழுத்தும் தெளிவாய்ப்

பொருந்தவே வந்தென் உளந்தனில் புகுந்து

குருவடி வாகிக் குவலயந் தன்னில்

திருவடி வைத்துத் திறம் இதுபொருள்என

வாடா வகைதான் மகிழ்ந்தெனக் கருளிக்

கோடா யுதத்தால் கொடுவினை களைந்தே

உவட்டா உபதேசம் புகட்டிஎன் செவியில்

தெவிட்டாத ஞானத் தெளிவையுங் காட்டி

ஐம்புலன் தன்னை அடக்கும் உபாயம்

இன்புறு கருணையின் இனிதெனக் கருளிக்

கருவிகள் ஒடுங்கும் கருத்தினை அறிவித்(து)

இருவினை தன்னை அறுத்திருள் கடித்து

தலமொரு நான்கும் தந்தெனக் கருளி

மலமொரு மூன்றின் மயக்கம் அறுத்தே

ஒன்பது வாயில் ஒருமந் திரத்தால்

ஐம்புலக் கதவை அடைப்பதுங் காட்டி

ஆறா தாரத்து அங்குச நிலையும்

பேறா நிறுத்திப் பேச்சுரை அறுத்தே

இடைபிங் கலையின் எழுத்தறி வித்துக்

கடையில் சுழிமுனைக் கபாலமும் காட்டி

மூன்றுமண் டலத்தின் முட்டிய தூணின்

நான்றெழு பாம்பின் நாவில் உணர்த்திக்

குண்டலி அதனில் கூடிய அசபை

விண்டெழு மந்திரம் வெளிப்பட உரைத்து

மூலா தாரத்து மூண்டெழு கனலைக்

காலால் எழுப்பும் கருத்தறி வித்தே

அமுத நிலையும் ஆதித்தன் இயக்கமும்

குமுத சகாயன் குணத்தையும் கூறி

இடைச்சக் கரத்தின் ஈரெட்டு நிலையும்

உடற்சக் கரத்தின் உறுப்பையுங் காட்டிச்

சண்முக தூலமும் சதுர்முக சூட்சமும்

எண்முக மாக இனிதெனக்(கு) அருளிப்

புரியட்ட காயம் புலப்பட எனக்குத்

தெரிஎட்டு நிலையும் தரிசனப் படுத்தி

கருத்தினில் கபால வாயில் காட்டி

இருத்தி முத்தி இனிதெனக்கு அருளி

என்னை அறிவித்து எனக்கருள் செய்து

முன்னை வினையின் முதலைக் களைந்து

வாக்கும் மனமும் இல்லா மனோலயம்

தேக்கியே என்றன் சிந்தை தெளிவித்து

இருள்வெளி இரண்டும் ஒன்றிடம் என்ன

அருள்தரும் ஆனந்தத்தை அழுத்திஎன் செவியில்

எல்லை இல்லா ஆனந்தம் அளித்து

அல்லல் களைந்தே அருள்வழி காட்டிச்

சத்தத்தின் உள்ளே சதாசிவம் காட்டிச்

சித்தத்தின் உள்ளே சிவலிங்கம் காட்டி.

அணுவிற்கு அணுவாய் அப்பாலுக்(கு) அப்பாலாய்க்

கணுமுற்றி நின்ற கரும்புள்ளே காட்டி

வேடமும் நீறும் விளங்க நிறுத்திக்

கூடுமெய்த் தொண்டர் குழாத்துடன் கூட்டி

அஞ்சக் கரத்தின் அரும்பொருள் தன்னை

நெஞ்சக் கருத்தின் நிலையறிவித்துத்

தத்துவ நிலையைத் தந்தெனை ஆண்ட

வித்தக விநாயகா! விரை கழல் சரணே!.

== Translation (Lyrics in English) ==
Cool, white and fragrant lotus like feet,
with anklets tinkling sweet in multitude beat,
gold girdle, garments as soft as flower,
colorfully wrapping your comely hips lower,

belly like a pot and big, heavy tusk,
elephant-face with the perfect red mark,
five hands, the goad, the noose in hands apart,
dwelling divine beautiful blue body in my heart,

With pendulous mouth and one with four mighty shoulder,
having three eyes that denotes three sect marks bolder,
two ears, the gold crown gleaming on your head,
the breast glowing with the holy triple thread.

Oh divine turya knowledge, Beautiful beyond word,
who came as wish-fulfilling elephant, we heard.
Oh mouse-rider, fond of the three famed fruit,
desire to make me yours this instant, takes root,

Having appeared before me, like a mother,
Cutting delusion of unending births, not another.
imprinting the five prime letters, clearly,
You have come and entered my heart, dearly.

Stepped in the form of a teacher, into my world,
Thine divine feet, pointing to the priceless, gold,
With the divine knowledge without fatigue, blessed,
With that unfailing weapon, my heinous sins, severed.

Uncloying pure precepts, poured in my ear,
clarity of ever-fresh awareness, laid bare -
for firm control of all of my senses, five,
out of kindness, thou have blessed me high.

Brought the idea of the organs of action, controlled,
snapped my two-fold karma and my darkness dispelled,
a place for me in all four states, your grant,
dissolved the illusion of triple filth,

Using a single name over the temple with nine-doored,
five-door senses now under control, free no more,
fixed me firm in all of the six yogic centers,
Stabilized in myself, speechless joy, I enter.

of ida and pingala, having been introduced,
last the head of sushumna, to me, you showed,
three bright spheres of sun, moon and fire,
To the tongue of the serpent that sinks and soar.

Having achieved the energy of Kundali assemblage,
and explicitly uttered it purely through your grace;
flame of muladhara, collected in me and raging,
imparted the skill of breath, steadily rising.

The state of immortality, the sun's moving trend
and the charm of the moon; the water lily's friend,
the sixteen states of the chakras intermediary,
revealed to me in thoughtful wisdom in my body.

the six-faced form and four-faced body subtle,
and the eight separate modes of my eternal soul;
Given me understanding of subtle body that is divine,
Miraculous powers, my mind is open to your design.

the never-closing gateway of Brahman opened so,
You have also given me the final mukti, too;
revealed my Self to me and by your grace
My accumulated karma, swept of the base.

State beyond speech and thought, in tranquil calm
You clarified my intellect, this is now my form.
making me experience, at the spot between two eyes,
through your divine blessing, between my ears, bliss.

You have given me the state of boundless elation,
showing me the way of grace, ending all affliction,
As the core of the sound Om, I have seen Sadasiva,
At the core of my mind, you have shown me lingasiva.

atom within atom, vast beyond all vastness,
hid in the hardened node, having tasted sweetness.
You have steadied me clear in human form, devoid of duality,
added me to the congregation of your servants true and trusty.

Of the Five-handed one, the absolute true essence,
You have given it to me in my heart, the experience,
restored my real state to me; and will rule me now,
Oh Master of Wisdom, Vinayaka, to thine feet alone, I bow,
Oh Master of Wisdom, Vinayaka, to thine feet alone, I bow.
