= Pamban Swamigal =

Tamil Hindu saint and poet

Pamban Gurudasa Swamigal பாம்பன் குமரகுருதாச சுவாமிகள் ( Appavu )
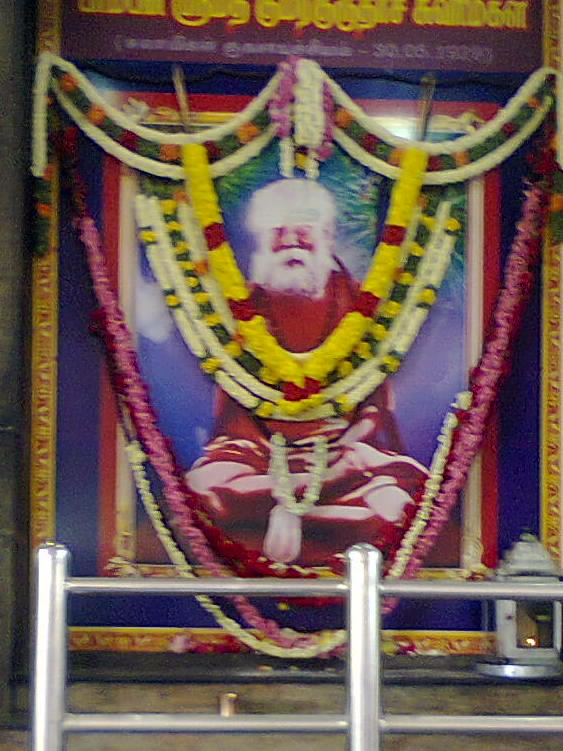
- The original image of Pamban Gurudasa Swamigal at his samādhi.

Personal life
- Born: Appavu; 1848-50 Rameswaram; Tamil Nadu, India

Religious life
- Religion: Hinduism

Religious career
- Teacher: Murugan's devotee

Pamban Gurudasa Swamigal (Tamil: பாம்பன் குமரகுருதாச சுவாமிகள்), popularly known as Pamban Swamigal, was an Indian Tamil Hindu saint and poet. He was a devoted follower of the Tamil god Murugan and composed numerous poems in Murugan's praise. His samadhi is located in Tiruvanmiyur, Chennai.

== Early life and education ==
Pamban Swamigal was born sometime between 1848 and 1850 into a Shaivite family in the town of Rameswaram which was then part of Ramnad district, now known as Ramanathapuram district. He was originally named Appāvu, but later became known as Pamban Swamigal after leaving his family and residing on Pamban Island. A psychic predicted that Appāvu would become a man of great wisdom and eloquence. During his school years, Appavu excelled in his studies and other activities, ranking high in both Tamil and English.

At the age of thirteen, on a Friday at sunrise, Appāvu had a vision that inspired him to write poems dedicated to Murugan. He immediately wrote the first poem on a palm leaf while in his coconut estate. For the next 100 days, he composed one poem each day before lunch, ending each decad with the name of his manasika guru, Arunagiri Nāthar.

== His experiences with Lord Muruga ==
Since Pāmban Swāmi was drawn to a spiritual life from an early age, his parents were eager to arrange his marriage, which took place in 1878. His wife's name was Kalimuthami, and they had one son and two daughters. Even after marriage, Pamban Swami lived like a saint, dedicating much of his time to poojas and prayers. After his father's death, Pāmban Swāmi took over the family business and successfully resolved many legal issues related to it, which he attributed to the grace of Murugan.

One night, Pāmban Swāmi's daughter was crying due to illness. Her mother asked Pāmban Swāmi to give vibhuti to the child, but he declined and instead advised her to pray to Murugan for help. He then entered a state of meditation, focusing on Murugan. Following his advice, she prayed as instructed. After some time, Pāmban Swāmi noticed that the child had stopped crying and was peacefully asleep. When he asked his wife about the change, she explained that, after her prayer to Murugan, a saintly figure entered the house, applied vibhuti to the child, and then left. From that moment, the child was cured. Pāmban Swāmi believed that Murugan himself had come to their aid in response to their prayers.

== Palani Incident ==
One day, a friend of Pamban Swami informed him that he was going to Palani, the sacred hill temple. Pamban Swami, too, wished to visit Palani and left his family without informing them. When his friend asked if he had permission from his god, Pamban Swami replied, “Yes,” though he was not being truthful. That same day, Lord Palani Murugan appeared before him with a frowning face and asked, “Did I ask you to come there? If I wanted your presence at the hill, I could have made it happen easily. There is no reason for you to lie. I will call you when the time comes. For now, remain where you are, without attachments.” The Lord then asked Pamban Swami to promise that he would not go to Palani without His permission.

To keep his word, Pamban Swami never went to Palani for the rest of his life. He also renounced the taste of lime, salt, and hot spices, and subsisted on plain rice with green dal and ghee. He would eat only once a day before noon; if he missed this time, he would wait until the following day to eat.

== Making of Shanmuga Kavacham ==
In 1891, Pamban Swami composed Shanmuga Kavacham, a powerful hymn of 30 verses written for the benefit of Murugan’s devotees, to protect them from physical and mental illness, as well as from enemies, wild beasts, poisonous creatures, demons, devils, and biting insects. Numerous instances attest to the effectiveness of the Shanmuga Kavacham in providing such protection. If one recites it with heartfelt devotion to Murugan, the results are said to be swift and miraculous. A unique feature of the 30 verses is that 12 begin with vowels (uyir ezhuthukkal) and 18 with consonants, making it easier for devotees to memorize.

== Making of Panchamirtha varnam ==
Also in 1891, Pamban Swami composed Panchamrita Varnam. Murugan Himself is said to have told an elderly woman in Tiruchendur, “I will be physically present wherever this song is sung in a pleasant tone.” If one performs puja in their heart by reciting this poem, it is considered equivalent to performing abhisekam and puja.

Once, while walking on a rough path, a thorn pricked and pierced Pamban Swami’s foot, causing him intense pain. He shed tears and prayed to God for relief. That same night, Murugan appeared in the dream of a cobbler in a nearby village and instructed him to make and give a pair of slippers to Pamban Swami. The next day, as Pamban Swami was traveling to the village, the cobbler approached him with the slippers, explaining that Murugan had appeared in his dream and instructed him to make them. Pamban Swami was deeply moved and thanked Murugan for His kindness toward His devotees.

Pamban Swami once fell very ill due to diarrhea. He fainted and collapsed, and upon seeing this, his wife also fainted. At that moment, Murugan appeared at their house, tapped the ground with a stick, and instructed Pamban Swami's wife to get up. He assured her, saying, “Don’t worry. He will be alright. Just smear vibhuti on his body and say, ‘I will never leave you.’” However, Pamban Swami's wife was hesitant to touch the vibhuti, as it was her menstrual period. Lord Bala Murugan then told her, “There is no prohibition during an emergency.” She followed His instructions, and immediately, Pamban Swami was cured.

One day, someone told Pamban Swami that a poet had been working on a song of 100 verses but had been unable to complete it for the past two months. Upon hearing this, Pamban Swami decided to compose a similar song. He began and finished 125 verses within an hour. To this day, no poet or saint has duplicated such a feat. The poem is called Tiruvorumalai Komagan. The first verse, consisting of four lines, contains 64 words in each line, totaling 256 words. Pamban Swami composed the remaining 124 verses without adding any extra words. He said that with divine guidance, anything is possible.

== Visit to Kumarakottam ==
During his visit to Kanchipuram in Tamil Nadu, Pamban Swami had failed to visit Kumarakottam, the famous Murugan temple in the town. On his way back, Murugan appeared before him in the form of a 30-year-old man wearing a turban and asked if he had visited Kumarakottam, where the Kanda Puranam was composed by the temple priest Kanchiappa Sivachariyar. The man took Pamban Swami near the temple and then vanished. After performing the pujas, Pamban Swami was filled with joy, deeply grateful for the grace of Lord Kumaran. At the railway station, the train was delayed due to a fault, as though it were waiting for Pamban Swami. Once he boarded, the train proceeded without any further delay.

In 1894, at Peerapan Valasai near Ramanad in Tamil Nadu, Pamban Swami was determined to receive upadesam from Murugan Palani Andi Himself, and from no one else. He obtained permission from the government officer to dig a pit in the burial ground, measuring 3' x 3' x 3', which was covered with a lock and key for the roof. Before beginning his meditation, he instructed his followers to have faith in God. Because this was a burial ground, there were many disturbing events that occurred. On one occasion, a large demon attempted to seize Pamban Swami, but by hurling his dandam, the demon vanished. On the seventh night, a voice commanded Pamban Swami to get up. Pamban Swami replied that he would not rise unless Lord Palani Andi Himself came, even if it meant his death. The voice responded again, saying, "Your Lord has come to see you. Open your eyes."

Pamban Swami was delighted to see Murugan in the form of Palani Andi, holding a dandam in one hand and the other hand in chin mudra, accompanied by two rishis. With a smiling countenance, Palani Andi approached, gave a "single utterance" (oru mozhi) of upadesam in Pamban Swami's right ear, and then turned, walking towards the west before vanishing. Without rising, Pamban Swami was deeply pleased by the divine word and continued his meditation for 28 days without food, water, or sleep.

On the 35th day, a voice was heard again, commanding him to "Come out of the pit." Pamban Swami replied that he would only come out if it was by his Lord's command. The voice responded, "Yes, it's me." At once, Pamban Swami emerged from the pit and saw the full moon of Chitra Poornima in the sky. He was wearing a single piece of cloth, similar to that of a Patanatar or an āndi.

Later, his followers requested him to wear two pieces of white cloth—one around his waist and the other over his shoulder. Pamban Swami was content to remain silent, but others urged him to share his experience. Even today, the oil lamp that Pamban Swami used in the pit is preserved in Ramanad town by his followers.

In 1895 Pamban Swami took sannyasa and left Pamban village. One day Murugan appeared in his dream and asked him to proceed to Madras. But he accepted the command of his Lord and proceeded to Madras by train.

== Madras trip ==
Upon his arrival at Egmore railway station in Madras, a cartman approached Pamban Swami and requested that he sit in his cart. Without saying a word, Pamban Swami sat in the jatka. The cartman took him to St. George Town, to house number 41, Vaithiyanath Mudali Street. When Pamban Swami got down from the cart, an elderly lady, Mrs. Bangaru Ammal, approached him and explained that the previous night, in a dream, Murugan had told her that a saint would visit her house and that she should provide him with food and accommodation. Pamban Swami accepted her invitation and stayed there for some time.

== Making of Thagaralaya Rahasiyam ==
In 1896, Pamban Swami visited Chidambaram and wrote an Upanishad known as Thagaralaya Rahasiyam. He explained that Lord Guha resides in every heart in the form of a tiny light. Pamban Swami drew examples from the Vedas, Agamas, Upanishads, Tevaram, Tiruppukazh, and other scriptural sources. He also wrote two books, Tiropa and Paripuranat Būthan. In these books, Pamban Swami provided quotations from all 108 Upanishads. He is the only saint who composed 50 poems on Murugan in pure Tamil, without using words from other languages, out of his love for Tamil. Pamban Swami once said that anyone who speaks ill of either Sanskrit or Tamil is his enemy. He believed that these two sacred languages are like two eyes; one cannot embrace one and despise the other if one seeks full knowledge of the spiritual world.

During Pamban Swami's visit to Varanasi, he stayed at the Kumāra Guruparar Mutt. He wrote that he was very happy to stay at this famous mutt. The head of the mutt once offered him a kavi cloth, taking away his white dress, and requested Pamban Swami to wear it. At first, Pamban Swami hesitated, but upon reflection, he accepted it as God's wish and began wearing the two-piece kavi dress from that day forward.

Once, during a Shasti Pūja when Pamban Swami was present, the devotees had cooked rice for one hundred people. However, the rice pot kept providing enough rice to feed nearly 400 people. The demand was so great that the other foods, like vegetables, sambar, and rasam, had to be prepared three times, yet the cooked rice never ran out. Such miracles were commonplace in the life of Pamban Swami.

While in Madras, Pamban Swami had a premonition of his mother's death and his elder son's death. Before the telegram arrived, Pamban Swami instructed that no one should disturb him, as he was a sannyāsi—a man without family or attachments.

== Fracture cure ==
In December 1923, Pamban Swami had an accident on Thumbu Chetty Street in Madras. He was run over by a jatka, and his left ankle was broken. He was admitted to the General Hospital, where the doctors attending to him said that his leg would need to be amputated.

Pamban Swami was only praying and said, "Let them do what they want to do." Upon hearing the news, only Chinaswami Jothidar had extraordinary faith in Pamban Swami's poem Shanmuga Kavacham and began to recite it. Chinaswamy Jothidar had a vision of the Vel entering Pamban Swami's broken ankle. Miraculously, the leg was healed in the hospital. Even the British doctors were astonished and described it as divine grace.

On the 11th day, Pamban Swami saw two peacocks dancing before him and also saw Murugan in the form of an infant lying next to his bed. Recalling this day, Pamban Swami told his followers at the Maha Tejo Mandal Sabhai to have faith in Murugan and to perform the Mayūravahana Sevana Vizhā without fail. This ritual is still observed annually at his temple in Thiruvanmiyur. Pamban Swami's life proves that "Vēlum Mayilum Thunai" is not just a saying; it truly aids sincere devotees in need.

One day, Pamban Swami called Chinaswami Jothidar to find land in Tiruvanmiyur, as he felt his last days were near. Pamban Swami marked the corners of the floor with his leg, and all arrangements were made for the portion of land to be purchased. On 30 May 1929, at 7:15 AM, Pamban Swami called his followers and advised them to have faith in Murugan. He then took a deep breath, held it inside, and entered the state of samādhi.

Pamban Swamigal was a believer in one God, Siva, the Para Brahman, and he regarded Subrahmanya as a part of Siva, coming from Siva. He clarifies this in his book Subrahmanya Veyasam. Pamban Swami earned the name "Kumara Guru Dāsa Swāmigal" due to his deep love for Palani Murugan. His Sanskrit teacher named him Kumara Guru and also called him Pāmban Swāmigal because he lived and left his family at Pāmban Island.

Pamban Swami's full name is Adhyāsrama Suddha Vaidheega Saiva Siddhānta Jñānabānu, which means Pamban Swami is full of sayasi. He was a sannyāsi who followed Suddha Advaita in the Vaideha tradition of Saiva Siddhānta in the Dāsa Marga.

In his lifetime, Pamban Swami wrote 6,666 poems, 32 viyasams, and 1,000 names of Murugan. By reciting his Gnānamūrtham hymn, one can benefit in both this world and the next. He composed poems on Murugan in more than 130 different forms according to Tamil grammar. Pamban Swami preferred performing silent Akā Pūja over audible pūja.

== Songs composed ==
- Shanaṇmuga Kavacham
- Pañcāmirutha Vaṇṇam
- Kumarakurutāsa Svāmigaḷ Pādal - 1266
- Srīmath Kumāra Svāmiyam (Kumāra Nāyakaṉ Thiruviḷaiyādal) - 1192
- Thiruvalaṅkatṟiraṭṭu (Pala Santha Parimaḷam) - 1135
- Thiruppā (Tiṭpa Urai) - 1101
- Kāsiyātthirai (Vadanāṭṭu Yātthirai Aṉubavam) - 608
- Siṟu Nūṟṟiraṭṭu (Shaṇmuga Kavacham and other songs) - 258
- Sīvayātaṉā Viyāsam (Jeevakāruṇyam - Pulāl Maṟuppu) - 235
- Paripūraṇāṉantha Bōtham (Sivacūriya Prakāsam Urai) - 230
- Sekkar Vēḷ Semmāppu - 198
- Sekkar Vēḷ Iṟumāppu - 64
- Thakarālaya Ragasiyam (Sathāṉantha Sāhara Urai)- 117
- Kumaravēḷ Pathitṟu Patthanthāthi - 100
- Sēntaṉ Senthamiḻ (Pure Tamil Words)- 50
- Kumārastavam 44
- Theṉṉāṭṭu Thirutthala Dharisaṉam (Kaṭṭaḷai Kalitthuṟai) 35
- Patthu Pirapantham (Chittira Kavigaḷ) 30
- Aṉanthakkaḷippu 30
- Samāthāṉa Saṅgeetham 1
- Shanmuga Sahasra Nāmārcchaṉai 2

He wrote 6,666 hymns and 32 compositions to celebrate Lord Muruga.
