= Timeline of Hindu texts =

Hindu scriptures are traditionally classified into two parts: śruti, meaning "what has been heard" (originally transmitted orally) and Smriti, meaning "what has been retained or remembered" (originally written, and attributed to individual authors). The Vedas are classified under śruti.

The following list provides a somewhat common set of reconstructed dates for the terminus ante quem of Hindu texts, by title and genre. It is notable that Hinduism largely followed an oral tradition to pass on knowledge, for which there is no record of historical dates. All dates here given ought to be regarded as roughly approximate, subject to further revision, and generally as relying for their validity on highly inferential methods and standards of evidence.

== Samhita, Brahmana layers of the Vedas ==
- Rigveda, 1500 – 1100 BCE
- Samaveda, 1200 – 800 BCE
- Yajurveda, 1100 – 800 BCE
- Atharvaveda, 1000 – 800 BCE

The early Upanishads were composed over 900 – 300 BCE.

== Others ==
- Mahabharata, 400 BCE (Origins likely in the 8th or 9th century BCE)
- Bhagavad Gita, 2-3rd century BCE
- Ramayana, 400 BCE
- Samkhya Sutra
- Mimamsa Sutra, 300 – 200 BCE
- Arthashastra, 400 BCE – 200 CE
- Nyāya Sūtras, 2nd century BCE
- Vaiśeṣika Sūtra, 2nd century BCE
- Yoga Sutras of Patanjali, 100 BCE – 500 BCE
- Brahma Sutra, 500 BCE
- Puranas, 250 – 1000 CE
- Shiva Sutras, 120 BCE
- Abhinavabharati, 950 – 1020 CE
- Yoga Vasishtha, 750 CE

== See also ==
- List of historic Indian texts
- Sangam literature
- Manusmriti
