= Hindu devotional movements =

Devotional movements refers to various forms of Hinduism in India that co-exist with differing doctrines and practices. The history of worship in India is one of hybridisation. In ancient times various regions each had their own local myths and folklore, worshipping their own collection of local spirits and deities. Repeated invasions from the north as well as a vast expansion of trade with the west such as Siraf and with China to the east, brought increased contact with other cultures. India prospered through trade beginning in the days of the Roman Empire. An indicator of the Indian merchants' importance in Siraf comes from records describing dining plates reserved for them. Over time a process of cultural accommodation occurred and the local pantheons of spirits were merged with the foreign. The origin of the major Hindu deities, Vishnu, Shiva, and the various forms of the female consorts or goddess such as Shakti and Durga and the history of their possible converging or merging is not reliably documented. It is likely that in this way, for example, Vishnu collected his long list of Avatars or bodily manifestations. This accounts for the wide range in their divine powers and their rich and contradictory personalities.

== History ==
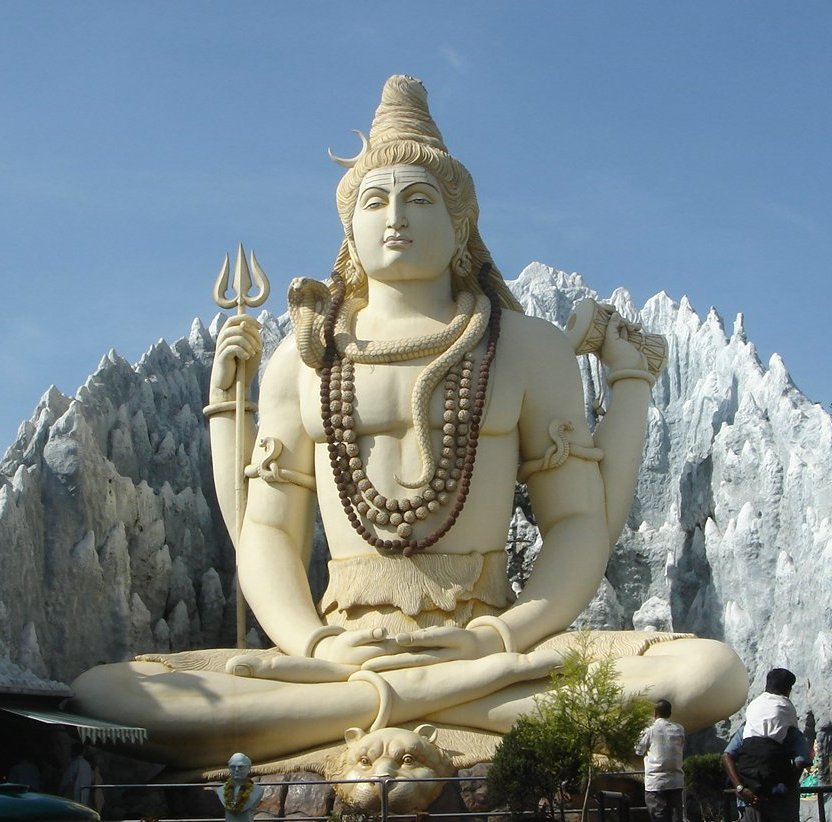
Lord Shiva

The history of devotional movements is as ancient as that of the worship of the significant deities. While Hinduism is often described as having 30,000 gods in its pantheon, from an anthropological and historical perspective the most significant devotional movements of the past two thousand years have centered on only a few. But together with these significant gods are thousands of gods arising from ancient customs and beliefs. There are household gods, village gods, gods of the forests and mountains, agricultural gods, and regional deities. The movements of some of these deities are as ancient as those of the primary gods, and the devotees of these deities often have intertwined histories and practices.

In trying to account for the large number of Pandyan rock-cut temples built between 650 and 835 A.D. art historian K.V.Soundara Rajan attributes this proliferation to the "insistent demand of cult groups".

However, the history of Hinduism is most closely tied to the parallel creation of two major groups, that of Shiva and Vishnu, each made up of an amalgamation of many minor deities. The Divine Mother or the Goddess, Shakti often shown in the aspect of Durga, is a third major group. Most Hindus allied themselves with one of the three major groups while not denying the existence of the others. The simultaneous development of these Hindu groups seemed primarily peaceful with little documentation of friction or persecution, as the general belief was that the group deities were different aspects of the divine and all led to the same goal whatever the specific practices (Moksha).

== Form ==
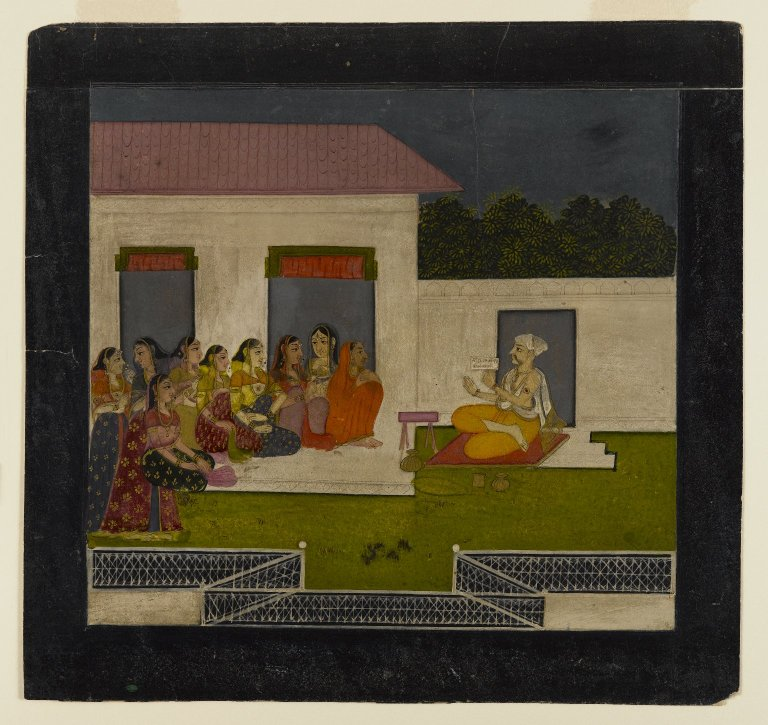
Brooklyn Museum - Devotional Discourse ca.1750-1775

More important in daily life of many Hindus than the major deities are the many ancient minor deities of folklore that control more practical concerns, the pantheon of folk demi-gods and spirits such as the yakshas and yakshini and their king Kubera who regulates such matters as fertility and wealth, and mythical beings such as apsaras, water nymphs associated with good fortune, sacred waters and other natural elements who entertain the gods in heaven.

Worship is the common form of Hindu devotion. However, many other forms are commonly practiced, including pilgrimage, festival procession, and healing bathing at sacred sites. Hindu devotional modes of expression are devotional poetry, mythology, art and iconography.

== See also ==
- Bhakti
- Vahana
- Dvaita
