= Panchāpsaras =

Lake featured in the Ramayana

Panchāpsaras (Sanskrit: पञ्चाप्सर, romanized: Pañcāpsara) is a lake mentioned in Book III of the ancient Sanskrit epic Ramayana. Its name means (the lake of) the five apsaras, the celestial nymphs of Ancient Hindu history. This lake is visited by Rama, the seventh avatar of Vishnu in Hinduism, during his journey through the Dandaka forest. The lake is said to have been created by Sage Māṇḍakarṇi through the power of his penance.

== Legend ==
The Ramayana describes the legend of the sage Māṇḍakarṇi, who is stated to have created this lake in the Dandaka forest, the site of his austere practices. Growing wary of the power of his penance, the deity Indra sent five apsaras to enchant and tempt him away from his penance, in which he is stated to have stood over the lake and consumed only air for ten millennia. The apsaras succeeded in their goal, and became the wives of the sage. They resided in a house obscured within the lake, which was named for them. The sage himself is mentioned to live in a palace upon an island in the centre of the lake. Rama is described to have observed that the air around this lake bore the fragrance of music, which a seer told him emerged from the songs of the apsaras.
