= Devaraya Swamigal =

Indian writer and Hindu guru

Personal life
- Born: c. 1857
- Notable work: Kanda Shasti Kavasam

Religious life
- Religion: Hinduism
- Philosophy: Kaumaram

Religious career
- Teacher: Shree Thirisipuram Meenakshi Sundaram Pillai

Devaraya Swamigal (born c. 1857) was a Tamil devotee of Murugan, a form of the Hindu deity Kartikeya. He is best known for his composition of the Tamil hymn Kanda Shasti Kavasam.

== Biography ==
Not much is known about Devaraya Swamigal. He was born in 1857 in an affluent family in Vallur in the then region of Tondaimandalam. His father Shree Veeraswami Pillai served as Dubash of Mysore under the British rule, owning properties in Bangalore. Devarayan began his career as an accountant. Devaraya Swamigal's ardent inclination towards the Tamil language resulted in his learning the language under Shree Thirisipuram Meenakshi Sundaram Pillai, a pundit from Tiruchy. Soon he started writing poems, with his teacher editing and correcting them.

Devaraya Swamigal eventually wrote six hymns, popularly known as kavachams or kavasams (literally meaning "armour"), the most popular of which is the Kanda Shasti Kavacham. The other kavasams are Siva Kavacham, Shanmuga Kavacham, Shakthi Kavacham, and Narayana Kavacham. Apart from these, he also wrote Kuselopakyaanam, Thanigasala Maalai,Shatru Samhara Vel Pathigam, Panchaakara Desigar Pathigam, and Seda Maalai.

== See also ==
- Murugan
- Soolamangalam Sisters
