= Kanda Shasti Kavasam =

Tamil Hindu hymn

Kanda Sashti Kavasam or Skanda Shashti Kavacham is a Tamil devotional song composed for the Hindu god Kartikeya. It was composed by Devaraya Swamigal (born c. 1820), in 19th century CE in Chennimalai (in present day Erode district, Tamil Nadu).

== Composition ==
The hymn was composed in the 19th century by Devaraya Swamigal at the Subramania Swamy Temple in Chennimalai, Erode district in Tamil Nadu. 'Chiragiri Velavan' in the hymn refers to the lord of Chennimalai.

== Description ==
The song consists of 44 lines, including four introductory lines known as the kāppu, followed by a couple of meditational lines and the main song portion consisting of 238 lines known as the kavacham. The introductory part and meditational part follows Nerisai Venpa and Kural Venba metres respectively. The main part follows the grammar of Nilai Mandila Asiriyappa. The author's name is mentioned twice in the song, first in Line 64 and then in Line 201.

== Hymn ==
=== Invocation ===
Tamil Version

துதிப்போர்க்கு வல்வினை போம்; துன்பம்போம்; நெஞ்சில்
பதிப்போர்க்குச் செல்வம் பலித்துக்-கதித்தோங்கும்
நிஷ்டையும் கைகூடும், நிமலரருள் கந்தர்
சஷ்டி கவசம் தனை.

Thuthiporkku val vinai pom, Thunpam pom,
Nenjil pathiporkku selvam palithu kadithongum
Nishtayum kaikoodum
Nimalar Arul kanthar sashti kavacham thanai

English Translation

The sufferings great and sorrow will vanish for those who pray,
The riches will increase for those who remember it in their mind,
All penance will surely bear fruit
By this Shashti Kavacham written by the grace of God.

=== Meditation ===
Tamil Version
அமர ரிடர்தீர அமரம் புரிந்த
குமரனடி நெஞ்சே குறி.

Amarar idartheera amaram purintha
Kumaranadi nenjeh kuri.

English Translation

Mind, oh mine, meditate
On the feet of that Young God,
Who waged the war,
To end the problems of devas, great.

=== Main song ===
The main song can be classified into the following themes:

- Lines 1-16 Author invites the deity to the devotee
- Lines 17-27 Mantras are used to invite the deity presented to the devotee
- Lines 28-32 Upon using mantras, the divine light and the presence of the deity is felt
- Lines 33-45 Author describes the way the deity looks at the devotee
- Lines 46-54 Author strings the sounds of the deity's footsteps and anklets into mantras
- Lines 55-56 Depict the swiftness of the deity in coming to the rescue of His devotee
- Lines 57-58 Surrendering of the devotee to the deity and the devotee's prayers unto Him
- Lines 59-95 Praising the deity, these lines concern with the protection of individual parts of the body
- Lines 96-102 Concerns with the deity's saving of His devotee at all times of the day
- Lines 103-129 Concerns with the eradication of vicious effects of demons and devils
- Lines 130-140 Concerns with prayer to God's Messenger to release the devotee from the vicious cycle of birth and death
- Lines 141-148 Concerns with the protection from wild and venomous animals
- Lines 149-157 Concerns with freedom from diseases
- Lines 158-159 Prayer to maintain a cordial relationship with others
- Lines 160-175 Praises the deity by His various names and His divine deeds
- Lines 176-177 Worshiping goddess Saraswati, the goddess of knowledge
- Lines 178-186 Describes the divine power of the Sacred Ash (Vibuthi) and its effects
- Lines 187-192 Praises the deity
- Lines 193-199 Seeks asylum in the deity
- Lines 200-208 Describes the procedures for reciting the song
- Lines 209-214 Describes the divine effects of the song
- Lines 215-219 Describes the effects of the song on evil elements
- Lines 220-234 Praises the divine deeds of the deity
- Lines 235-238 Salutation and complete surrender of the self unto the deity

== Music ==
The Kanda Shasti Kavasam has been rendered by various artists, with notable amongst them include the Soolamangalam Sisters.

== Significance ==
When the devas could not tolerate the evil doings of the asura Surapadman, they approached Shiva and Parvati for assistance. Shiva and Parvati tasked their son Kartikeya to lead the army of devas against Surapadman. The devas praised Kartikeya and prayed to him for six days. He used his vel (divine spear) to split Surapadman into two halves, one half of which became a peacock, which he took as his vahana, and the other became a rooster, which was transformed into his banner. Surasamharam is celebrated to commemorate the event. Devotees observe a fast and narrate the Kanda Sashti Kavacham during a six-day period, known as Shashthi Vrata, that precedes the event. As stated in the hymns, regular chanting of the song 36 times a day causes the predicaments of life to be resolved and brings benefits to the chanter.

== In popular culture ==
The hymn is popular in the Tamil-speaking diaspora across the globe that the phrases from the hymn, its music, and others are often imitated. The titles of the Tamil movie Kaakha Kaakha, Thadaiyara Thaakka, Thakka Thakka and the Indian soap opera Kakka Kakka are taken from the Kanda Shasti Kavasam. The film song "Padhinettu Vayadhu Ilamottu Manadhu" from the movie Surieyan imitates the tune of the hymn.

In July 2020, Karuppar Kootam, a Periyarist-Dravidian group, posted a YouTube video with an interpretation of the hymn considered to be vulgar and offensive to Hindus. Soon after the incident, a complaint was filed by the Bharatiya Janata Party with the Commissioner of Police of Chennai, which led to the arrest of two members of the group.

== See also ==
- Skanda
- Skanda Purana
