= Ritu (season) =

Traditional seasons of the Indian calendar

Ritu (Sanskrit: ऋतु) means "season" in different ancient Indian calendars used in India, Bangladesh, Nepal and Sri Lanka. There are six ritus (also transliterated ritu) or seasons. Seasons are different times of the year and there are 12 months in the year. Every month has its own special season. The word is derived from the Vedic Sanskrit word Ṛtú, a fixed or appointed time, especially the proper time for sacrifice (yajna) or ritual in Vedic religion; this in turn comes from the word Ṛta (ऋत), as used in Vedic Sanskrit literally means the "order or course of things". This word is used in nearly all Indian languages.

== Nepalese and Indian calendars ==
Nepal and India observes six ecological seasons.

No.	Ritu	Season	Hindu lunar months	Gregorian month	Characteristics	Seasonal festivals
1	Vasanta वसन्त	Spring	Chaitra and Vaishakha	March & April	Temperature around 20-30 degrees celsius; vernal equinox occurs in the middle of this season. First spring harvest along with harvest festivals.	Ugadi, Gudi Padwa, Holi, Rama Navami, Puthandu, Vishu, Rongali Bihu, Baisakhi, Hanuman Jayanti
2	Grīṣma ग्रीष्म	Summer/Hot Season	Jyeshtha and Ashadha	~ May & June	Very hot, temperatures up to 45-50 degrees celsius; summer solstice occurs. This is one of the two typical Indian/ Hindu Marriage Seasons.	Vat Purnima, Ratha Yatra, Guru Purnima
3	Varṣā वर्षा	Monsoon/Rainy Season	Shravana and Bhadrapada	~ July & August	Very hot, very humid and heavy monsoon rains; begins with the lunar month after the summer solstice.	Raksha Bandhan, Krishna Janmashtami, Ganesh Chaturthi, Nuakhai, Onam, Gurujonar Tithi, Mahalaya Amavasya
4	Sharada शरत्	Autumn	Ashvina or Ashvayuja and Kartika	~ Late- September, October & mid-November	Mild temperatures; 19-25 degrees celsius; autumnal equinox occurs in the middle of this season. First autumn harvest occurs along with harvest festivals. Some trees in the Himalayas or upper elevations change colors much like in northern latitudes across the world.	Navaratri, Vijayadashami, Sharad Purnima, Kati Bihu, Deepavali, Dhanatrayodashi, Kartik Purnima
5	Hemanta हेमन्त	Pre-Winter/Cool Season	Margashirsha (Agrahayana) and Pausha	~ Late November & December	Very pleasant temperatures; generally, 19-25 degrees celsius; ends with the winter solstice. Some trees in the Himalayas and other hills completely shed their leaves much like in northern latitudes across the world.	(mid-winter celebration) Margashira Mahotsavam. Music Season with a number of Indian Carnatic classical music and dance concerts. Thai Pongal, Sankranti are celebrated during the month of Pausha.
6	Shishira शिशिर	Winter/Cold Season	Magha and Phalguna	~ January & February	Moderately cold, but pleasant during occasional sunshine; temperatures may decrease below 10 degrees celsius. This season is typical to tropical and subtropical regions because trees actually shed their leaves in this season in tropical areas; starts with the winter solstice.	Shivaratri, Magh Bihu Shigmo

== East Indian calendars ==
East Indian calendars (Bengali, Assamese, Odia and Mithila) start their new year on Mesh Sankranti. The season names corresponds to the Sanskrit Vasanta, Grishma, Varsha, Sharada, Hemanta, Shishira order. The Bengali Calendar is similar to the Sanskrit calendar above, but differs in start and end times which moves certain dates/days around (i.e., Vasant Panchami occurs here in Vasant ritu but in the calendar above, it occurs in Shishir as that is the Magha Shukla Panchami). The East Indian Calendar has the following seasons or ritus:

=== Assamese Calendar ===
Seasons in the Assamese Calendar:

Assamese season	Start	End	Assamese months	English
Grishmo (গ্রীষ্মকাল)	Mid-April	Mid-June	Bohag, Jeth	Summer
Borkha (বর্ষাকাল)	Mid-June	Mid-August	Ahaar, Xaaun	Monsoon
Xorot (শৰৎকাল)	Mid-August	Mid-October	Bhado, Ahin	Early Autumn
Hemanta (হেমন্তকাল)	Mid-October	Mid-December	Kati, Aghun	Late Autumn
Heat (শীতকাল)	Mid-December	Mid-February	Pooh, Magh	Winter
Boxonto (বসন্তকাল)	Mid-February	Mid-April	Phagun, Sot	Spring

=== Bengali Calendar ===
Seasons in the Bengali Calendar:

Bangla Ritu	Bengali Months	English Equivalent	Gregorian Months
গ্রীষ্ম (Grishsho)	বৈশাখ-জ্যৈষ্ঠ (Boishakh-Joishtho)	Summer	Mid April - Mid June
বর্ষা (Borsha)	আষাঢ়-শ্রাবণ (Aasharh-Shrabon)	Monsoon	Mid June - Mid August
শরৎ (Shorot)	ভাদ্র-আশ্বিন (Bhadro-Aashshin)	Autumn	Mid August - Mid October
হেমন্ত (Hemonto)	কার্তিক-অগ্রহায়ণ (Kartick-Ogrohayon)	Early Winter	Mid October - Mid December
শীত (Śīta)	পৌষ-মাঘ (Poush-Maagh)	Winter	Mid December - Mid February
বসন্ত (Bosonto)	ফাল্গুন-চৈত্র (Falgun-Choitro)	Spring	Mid February - Mid April

=== Maithili Calendar ===
Seasons in the Maithili Calendar:

Maithili Ritu	English Equivalent	Maithili Months	Gregorian Months
ग्रीष्म (Grishma)	Summer	Baisakha-Jyeshtha	Mid-April to mid-June
वर्षा (Barkha)	Monsoon	Ashadha, Shravana	Mid-June to mid-August
शरद (Sharad)	Autumn	Bhādrapada, Āshvina	Mid-August to mid-October
हेमन्त Hemanta	Late-Autumn	Kārtika, Mārgashīrsha/Agrahayana	Mid-October to mid-December
शिशिर (Shishir)	Winter	Pausha, Magh	Mid-December to mid-February
वसन्त (Basanta)	Spring	Phalgun, Chaitra	Mid-February to mid-April

=== Odia Calendar ===
Seasons in the Odia calendar:

Odia Ritu	Season	Odia months	Gregorian
ଗ୍ରୀଷ୍ମ; Grisma	Summer	Baiśākha–Jyeṣṭha	April–June
ବର୍ଷା Barsā	Monsoon	Āṣāṛha–Śrābaṇa	June–August
ଶରତ; Sarata	Autumn	Bhādraba–Āświna	August–October
ହେମନ୍ତ; Hemanta	Pre-Winter	Kārttika–Mārgaśira	October–December
ଶୀତ; Sita	Winter	Pauṣa–Māgha	December–February
ବସନ୍ତ; Basanta	Spring	Phālguna–Chaitra	February–April

== South Indian calendars ==
=== Malayalam Kannada Telugu Calendar ===
The Malayalam calendar or Kollam Era, a solar and sidereal Hindu calendar used in Kerala, and in Karnataka they follows a pattern of six seasons slightly different from North Indian Calendars.

	Ritu	Season	Malayalam solar months	Sanskrit solar months	Gregorian months	Seasonal festivals
1	Vasantam വസന്തം వసంతం ವಸಂತ ಋತು	Spring	Makaram (second half)-Kumbham-Meenam (first half)	Makara (second half)-Kumbha-Mīna (first half)	February & March	Vasantha Panchami, Holi
2	Grishmam ഗ്രീഷ്മം గ్రీష్మం ಗ್ರೀಷ್ಮಋತು	Summer	Meenam (second half)-Medam-Idavam (first half)	Mīna (second half)-Meṣa-Vṛṣabha (first half)	April & May	Vishu
3	Varsham വർഷം వర్షాకాలం ವರ್ಷ ಋತು	Monsoon or Rain	Idavam (second half)-Mithunam-Karkatakam (first half)	Vṛṣabha (second half)-Mithuna-Karkaṭaka (first half)	June & July	Karkataka Vavu (marks the beginning of Sharad season)
4	Sarath ശരത്ത് శరదృతువు ಶರದ್ಋತು	Early Autumn	Karkitakam (second half)-Chingam-Kanni (first half)	Karkaṭaka (second half)-Siṃha-Kanyā (first half)	August & September	Rakshabandhanam, Krishna Janmashtami (Sri Krishna Jayanti), Onam
5	Hemantham ഹേമന്തം హేమంతం ಹೇಮಂತ ಋತು	Late Autumn	Kanni (second half)-Thulam-Vrischikam (first half)	Kanyā (second half)-Tulā-Vṛścikam (first half)	October & November	
6	Sisiram ശിശിരം శిశిరం ಶಿಶಿರ ಋತು	Winter	Vrischikam (second half)-Dhanu-Makaram (first half)	Vṛścikam (second half)-Dhanu-Makara (first half)	December & January	

=== Tamil calendar ===
The Tamil Calendar follows a similar pattern of six seasons as described in the Hindu calendar.

Tamil season Names	English Meaning	Gregorian Months	Tamil Months
Ilavenil (Mild Summer) இளவேனிற்காலம்	Tender heat / warmth	April 15 to June 14	Chittirai and Vaikāsi
Muthuvenil (Hot Summer) முதுவேனிற்காலம்	Matured heat / warmth	June 15 to August 14	Āni and Ādi
Kar (Monsoon) கார்காலம்	Dark Clouds	August 15 to October 14	Āvaṇi and Puraṭṭāsi
Kutir (Autumn) கூதிர் காலம்	Cold / Chill	October 15 to December 14	Aippasi and Kārtikai
Munpani (Pre-winter) முன்பனிக் காலம்	Early (Frontal) Dew / Mist	December 15 to February 14	Mārgaḻi and Tai
Pinpani (Prevernal / Early Spring) பின்பனிக் காலம்	Late (Rear) Dew / Mist	February 15 to April 14	Māsi and Panguni

== In culture ==
The seasons are described in literature such as the Sanskrit poem Ṛtusaṃhāra written by the legendary Sanskrit poet Kālidāsa.

Names of the ritu are commonly used for persons: typically, Vasant, Sharad, Hemant, Shishir and Varsh are "male" names; "female" names include Vasanti, Sharada, Hemanti, Grishma and Varsha.

Similar naming conventions are also used in Tamil: For female Ilavenil. For male Kar(Vannan).

== See also ==
- Astronomical basis of the Hindu Calendar
- Vedic timekeeping
