= Thai solar calendar =

Legal calendar in Thailand

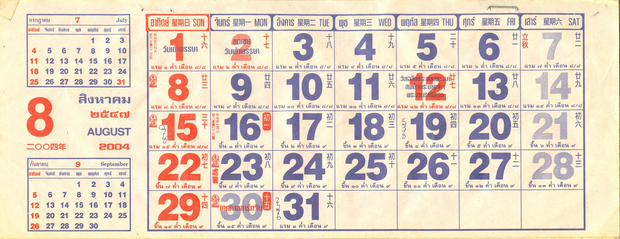
A panel from a typical calendar, showing the month of August 2004 (B.E. 2547). Lunar dates are also provided.

The Thai solar calendar (Thai: ปฏิทินสุริยคติไทย, RTGS: patithin suriyakhati thai, "Thai solar calendar") was adopted by King Chulalongkorn (Rama V) in 1888 CE as the Siamese version of the Gregorian calendar, replacing the Thai lunar calendar as the legal Thai calendar (though the latter is still also used, especially for traditional and religious events). Years are now counted in the Buddhist Era (B.E.): พุทธศักราช, พ.ศ. RTGS: Phutthasakkarat (lit. 'era of the Shaka Buddha') which is 543 years ahead of the Gregorian calendar.

== Years ==
The Siamese generally used two calendars, a sacred and a popular (vulgar in the classical sense). The vulgar or minor era (จุลศักราช, chula sakarat) was thought to have been instituted with the introduction of Buddhism, and corresponds to the traditional Burmese calendar (abbreviated ME or BE, the latter not to be confused with the abbreviation for the Buddhist Era, which is the sacred era.)

=== Rattanakosin Era ===
King Chulalongkorn (Rama V) decreed a change in vulgar reckoning to the Rattanakosin Era (รัตนโกสินทรศก, Rattanakosin Sok abbreviated ร.ศ. and R.E.) in 1889 CE. The epoch (reference date) for Year 1 was 6 April 1782 with the accession of Rama I, the foundation of the Chakri dynasty, and the founding of Bangkok as the capital of Rattanakosin Kingdom. To convert years in R.E. to the Common Era, add 1781 for dates from 6 April to December, and 1782 for dates from January to 5 April.

=== Buddhist Era ===
In Thailand the sacred, or Buddhist Era, is reckoned to have an epochal year 0 from 11 March 543 BC, believed to be the date of the death of Gautama Buddha. King Vajiravudh (Rama VI) changed year counting to this Buddhist Era (abbreviated BE) and moved the start of the year back to 1 April in 2455 BE, 1912 CE. This change marked the end of the Rattanakosin Era as the official calendar, and the Buddhist Era became the primary calendar system for the Thai government. To convert years in B.E. to the Common Era, subtract 543.

=== New year ===
New Year, the time at which a new calendar year begins and the calendar's year count is incremented, originally coincided with the date calculated for Songkran, when the Sun transits the constellation of Aries, the first astrological sign in the Zodiac as reckoned by sidereal astrology: thus the year commenced on 11 April 1822. As previously noted, Rama VI moved the start of the year back to 1 April in 2455 BE, 1912 CE, so that 130 R.S. only lasted for 356 days from 11 April 1911 to 31 March 1912.

On 6 September 1940, Prime Minister Phibunsongkhram decreed 1 January 1941 as the start of the year 2484 BE, so year 2483 BE had only nine months running from 1 April to 31 December 1940. To convert dates from 1 January to 31 March prior to that year, the number to add or subtract is 542; otherwise, it is 543. Example:

| Month | 1–3 | 4–6 | 7–9 | 10–12 | 1–3 | 4–6 | 7–9 | 10–12 | 1–3 | 4–6 | 7–9 | 10–12 | 1–3 | 4–6 | 7–9 | 10–12 |
| CE | 1939 | | | | 1940 | | | | 1941 | | | | 1942 | | | |
| BE | 2481 | 2482 | | | | 2483 | | | 2484 | | | | 2485 | | | |
| _{Thai Month} | 10–12 | 1–3 | 4–6 | 7–9 | 10–12 | 1–3 | 4–6 | 7–9 | 1–3 | 4–6 | 7–9 | 10–12 | 1–3 | 4–6 | 7–9 | 10–12 |

Today, both the Common Era New Year's Day (1 January) and the traditional Thai New Year (สงกรานต์, Songkran) celebrations (13–15 April) are public holidays in Thailand. In the traditional Thai calendar, the change to the next Chinese zodiacal animal occurs at Songkran (now fixed at 13 April.) For Thai Chinese communities in Thailand, however, the Chinese calendar determines the day that a Chinese New Year begins, and assumes the name of the next animal in the twelve-year animal cycle.

== Months ==
Names of the months derive from Hindu astrology names for the signs of the zodiac. Thirty-day-month names end in -ayon (-ายน), from Sanskrit root āyana, meaning the arrival of; 31-day-month names end in -akhom (-าคม), from Sanskrit āgama (cognate to English "come") that also means the arrival of.

February's name ends in -aphan (-าพันธ์), from Sanskrit bandha, meaning "fettered" or "bound". The day added to February in a solar leap year is Athikasurathin (อธิกสุรทิน, respelled to aid pronunciation (อะทิกะสุระทิน) from Sanskrit adhika: "additional"; and sura: "move".

Thai months name
| English name | Thai name | Abbr. | Thai pronunciation | Sanskrit word | Zodiac sign |
|---|---|---|---|---|---|
| January | มกราคม | ม.ค. | mákàraa-khom or mókkàraa-khom | Makara ("sea-monster") | Capricorn |
| February | กุมภาพันธ์ | ก.พ. | kumphaa-phan | Kumbha ("pitcher", "water-pot") | Aquarius |
| March | มีนาคม | มี.ค. | miinaa-khom | Mīna ("fish") | Pisces |
| April | เมษายน | เม.ย. | meesaǎ-yon | Meṣa ("ram") | Aries |
| May | พฤษภาคม | พ.ค. | phrɯ́tsaphaa-khom | Vṛṣabha ("bull") | Taurus |
| June | มิถุนายน | มิ.ย. | míthùnaa-yon | Mithuna ("a pair") | Gemini |
| July | กรกฎาคม | ก.ค. | kàrákàdaa-khom or kàrákkàdaa-khom | Karkaṭa ("crab") | Cancer |
| August | สิงหาคม | ส.ค. | sǐnghǎa-khom | Siṃha ("lion") | Leo |
| September | กันยายน | ก.ย. | kanyaa-yon | Kanyā ("girl") | Virgo |
| October | ตุลาคม | ต.ค. | tùlaa-khom | Tulā ("balance") | Libra |
| November | พฤศจิกายน | พ.ย. | phrɯ́tsajìkaa-yon | Vṛścika ("scorpion") | Scorpio |
| December | ธันวาคม | ธ.ค. | thanwaa-khom | Dhanu ("bow", "arc") | Sagittarius |

== Days ==
| Day | Thai name | Color of the day | Celestial Body | God of the day |
|---|---|---|---|---|
| Sunday | วันอาทิตย์ | Red | Sun | Surya |
| Monday | วันจันทร์ | Yellow or Cream | Moon | Chandra |
| Tuesday | วันอังคาร | Pink | Mars | Mangala |
| Wednesday | วันพุธ | Green | Mercury | Budha |
| Thursday | วันพฤหัสบดี | Orange | Jupiter | Brihaspati |
| Friday | วันศุกร์ | Light Blue | Venus | Shukra |
| Saturday | วันเสาร์ | Purple | Saturn | Shani |

== Problems ==
Using Buddhist era could easily cause confusion between itself and Anno Domini in the historical context. For example, Anno Domini 2026, and Buddhist year 2026 (which corresponds to AD 1483). Two-digit year numbering could cause even more confusion.

Another problem is the counting of the Buddhist era, which has changed several times in the past, including the inclusion of year 0, and the change of New Year's Day from April to January in 1941, has caused confusion in historical context as well. For example, many Thai people regard the establishment of the Ayutthaya Kingdom to be in 1350, which is direct conversion from Buddhist era 1893, while the actual date is 1351.

In computer programming, using the Buddhist era has sometimes caused the computer programs to void the license immediately, as the input values of the Buddhist era would exceed the expiration date for the program. Some users report that dates appear in future dates, due to the input data being the Buddhist era, while the computer is designed to accept Anno Domini.

== See also ==
- Buddhist calendar
- Date and time notation in Thailand
- Public holidays in Thailand
- Thai 6-hour clock
- Thai lunar calendar
- Time in Thailand
