= Bengali calendar =

Today (at UTC+00)
- Thursday, 8 October 2026
- Bengali: 23 Ashshin, BS 1433
Other calendars
| Akan | Foyaw |
| Armenian | 20 Sahmi 1476 |
| Aztec | Izcalli 6, 12 Quiyahuitl |
| Babylonian | 25 Ululu, 2337 SE |
| Balinese pawukon | Luang, Pepet, Pasah, Sri, Pon, Tungleh, Wraspati of Wayang, Sri, Nohan, Manuh |
| Chinese | Yin Wood Rabbit・Well Mansion; Fire Horse Year, Month 8, Day 28 (Hanlu, 15 days until Shuangjiang) |
| Common Era | 8 October 2026 CE |
| Coptic | 28 Thout, AM 1743 |
| Egyptian | 25 Mechir, 2775 NE |
| Ethiopian | 28 Maskaram, 2019 Amätä Məhrät |
| French Republican | Décade II, Sextidi de Vendémiaire de l'Année 235 de la République |
| Gregorian | 8 October, AD 2026 |
| Hebrew | 27 Tishrei, AM 5787 |
| Hindu | Pūrvaphalgunī・Śubha; Solar: 22 Āśvina, 1948 SE; Lunisolar: Trayodaśī, Kṛishna pakṣa of Bhādrapada, 2083 VE; Rāudra・5127 KY・1,872,856 |
| Icelandic | Fimmtudagur, 15 Haustmánuður 2026 |
| Islamic | 25 Rabi' al-thani, AH 1448 (using tabular method) |
| ISO week date | 2026-W41-4 |
| Japanese | 28 Hazuki, Reiwa 8 (Kanro, 15 days until Sōkō) |
| Julian | 25 September, AD 2026 (AM 7534) |
| Julian day | 2461322 |
| Korean | 28 Dakdal, 4359 DE |
| Maya | 13.0.13.17.19; 12 Yax, 12 Cauac |
| Roman | ante diem VII Kalendas Octobres, MMDCCLXXIX AUC |
| Solar Hijri | 16 Mehr, SH 1405 |
| Tibetan | 28 khrums, me pho rta 2153 or 1772 or 1000 |

The Bengali calendar or Bangla calendar (colloquially Bāṅlā Sôn or Bāṅlā Sāl, 'Bangla Year') is a solar calendar used in the Bengal region of the Indian subcontinent. In contrast to the traditional Indian Hindu calendar, which begins with the month Chaitra, the Bengali calendar starts with Baishakh. A revised version of the calendar is officially used in Bangladesh, while this traditional version continues to be followed in the Indian states of West Bengal, Tripura, and Assam.

The Bengali calendar began in 590–600 CE to commemorate the ascension of Shashanka, the first independent king in Bengal's unified polity. The first day of the Bengali year is known as Poila Boishakh (1st of Boishakh), which is a public holiday in West Bengal, Assam and Tripura.

The Bengali era is called Bengali Sambat (BS) and has a zero year that starts in 593/594 CE. It is 594 less than the AD or CE year in the Gregorian calendar if it is before Pohela Boishakh, or 593 less if after Pohela Boishakh.

== History ==
The Saka Era was widely used in Bengal prior to the arrival of Muslim rule in the region, according to various epigraphical evidence. The Bikrami calendar was in use by the Bengali people of the region. This calendar was named after King Vikramaditya with a zero date of 57 BCE. In rural Bengali communities, the Bengali calendar is credited to "Bikromaditto", like many other parts of India and Nepal. However, unlike these regions where it starts in 57 BCE, the modern Bangladeshi and Bengali calendar starts from 593 CE, suggesting that the starting point refers to the Bengali king Shashaka's ascent to the throne.

=== Hindu influence ===
Some historians attribute the Bengali calendar to the 7th-century Bengali king Shashanka, whose reign covered the Bengali era of 594 CE. The term Bangabda (Bangla year) is found too in two Shiva temples many centuries older than the Akbar era, suggesting that a Bengali calendar existed long before Akbar's time.

Hindus developed a calendar system in ancient times. Jyotisha, one of the six ancient Vedangas, was the Vedic era field of tracking and predicting the movements of astronomical bodies in order to keep time. The ancient Indian culture developed a sophisticated time keeping methodology and calendars for Vedic rituals.

The Hindu Vikrami calendar is named after King Vikramaditya and starts in 57 BCE. In rural Bengali communities of India, the Bengali calendar is credited to "Bikromaditto", like many other parts of India and Nepal. However, unlike these regions where it starts in 57 BCE, the Bengali calendar starts from 593, suggesting that the starting reference year was adjusted at some point. Various dynasties whose territories extended into Bengal, prior to the early 13th century, used the Vikrami calendar. For example, Buddhist texts and inscriptions created in the Pala Empire era mention "Vikrama" and the months such as Ashvin, a system found in Sanskrit texts elsewhere in the ancient and medieval Indian subcontinent.

Hindu scholars attempted to keep time by observing and calculating the cycles of the Sun (Surya), Moon, and the planets. These calculations about the Sun appear in various Sanskrit astronomical texts in Sanskrit, such as the 5th-century Aryabhatiya by Aryabhata, the 6th-century Romaka by Latadeva and Panca Siddhantika by Varahamihira, the 7th-century Khandakhadyaka by Brahmagupta, and the 8th-century Sisyadhivrddida by Lalla. These texts present Surya and various planets and estimate the characteristics of the respective planetary motion. Other texts, such as Surya Siddhanta, are dated to have been completed sometime between the 5th century and 10th century.

The current Bengali calendar in use by Bengali people in the Indian states such as West Bengal, Tripura, Assam, and Jharkhand is based on the Sanskrit text Surya Siddhanta and includes the modifications introduced during the reign of Shashanka, the first independent ruler of Gauda. The timeline of Shashanka becoming the sovereign ruler of Bengal, rising from a territorial ruler, matches with the first year of Bangabda. It retains the historic Sanskrit names of the months, with the first month as Baishakh. Their calendar remains tied to the Hindu calendar system and is used to set the various Bengali Hindu festivals.

=== Influence of the Islamic calendar ===
Another theory is that the calendar was first developed by Alauddin Husain Shah (reign 1494–1519), a Hussain Shahi sultan of Bengal, by combining the lunar Islamic calendar (Hijri) with the solar calendar, prevalent in Bengal. Yet another theory states that the Sasanka calendar was adopted by Alauddin Husain Shah when he witnessed the difficulty with collecting land revenue by the Hijri calendar.

During the Mughal rule, land taxes were collected from Bengali people according to the Islamic Hijri calendar. This calendar was a lunar calendar, and its new year did not coincide with the solar agricultural cycles. Akbar asked the royal astronomer Fathullah Shirazi to create a new calendar by combining the lunar Islamic calendar and solar Hindu calendar already in use, and this was known as Fasholi shan (harvest calendar). According to some historians, this started the Bengali calendar. According to Shamsuzzaman Khan, it could be Nawab Murshid Quli Khan, a Mughal governor, who first used the tradition of Punyaho as "a day for ceremonial land tax collection", and used Akbar's fiscal policy to start the Bangla calendar.

According to Amartya Sen, Akbar's official calendar, "Tarikh-ilahi" with the zero year of 1556, was a blend of pre-existing Hindu and Islamic calendars. It was not used much in India outside of Akbar's Mughal court, and after his death the calendar he launched was abandoned. However, adds Sen, there are traces of the "Tarikh-ilahi" that survive in the Bengali calendar. Regardless of who adopted the Bengali calendar and the new year, states Sen, it helped collect land taxes after the spring harvest based on the traditional Bengali calendar, because the Islamic Hijri calendar created administrative difficulties in setting the collection date. The government and newspapers of Bangladesh widely use the term Bangla shal (B.S.). For example, the last paragraph in the preamble of the Constitution of Bangladesh reads, "In our Constituent Assembly, this eighteenth day of Kartick, 1379 B.S., corresponding to the fourth day of November, 1972 A.D., do hereby adopt, enact and give to ourselves this Constitution." The zero year in the Bangladeshi calendar era is 593 CE.

Shamsuzzaman Khan wrote, "That it is called Bangla san or saal, which are Arabic and Parsee words respectively, suggests that it was introduced by a Muslim king or sultan." In contrast, according to Sen, its traditional name is Bangabda. In the era of Akbar, the calendar was called Tarikh-e-Elahi (তারিখ-ই ইলাহি). In the "Tarikh-e-Elahi" version of the calendar, each day of the month had a separate name, and the months had different names from what they have now. According to Banglapedia, Akbar's grandson Shah Jahan reformed the calendar to use a seven-day week that begins on Sunday, and the names of the months were changed at an unknown time to match the month names of the existing Saka calendar. This calendar is the foundation of the calendar that has been in use by the people of Bangladesh.

== Calendar structure ==
The Bengali calendar used in Bangladesh is a solar calendar, and the one used in India is a lunisolar calendar.

=== Months ===
The month names are derived from the names of the stars (nakshatras) and the seasons, and have been used for centuries.

| Month name (Bengali) | Romanization | Days (Bangladesh, 1966/1987–2018) | Days (Bangladesh, 2019–) | Start date (Bangladesh, 2019–) | Days (India) (Exact Period in Days) | Traditional Season in Bengal | Month name (Gregorian calendar) | Month name (Hindu Vikrami solar) |
|---|---|---|---|---|---|---|---|---|
| বৈশাখ | Boishakh | 31 | 31 | 14 April | 30/31 (30.950) | গ্রীষ্ম (Grishshô); Summer | April–May | Mesha |
| জ্যৈষ্ঠ | Jyoishţho | 31 | 31 | 15 May | 31/32 (31.429) | গ্রীষ্ম (Grishshô); Summer | May–June | Vrshaba |
| আষাঢ় | Ashaŗh | 31 | 31 | 15 June | 31/32 (31.638) | বর্ষা (Bôrsha); Wet season/Monsoon | June–July | Mithuna |
| শ্রাবণ | Shrabon | 31 | 31 | 16 July | 31/32 (31.463) | বর্ষা (Bôrsha); Wet season/Monsoon | July–August | Karkataka |
| ভাদ্র | Bhadro | 31 | 31 | 16 August | 31/32 (31.012) | শরৎ (Shôrôd); Autumn | August–September | Simha |
| আশ্বিন | Ashshin | 30 | 31 | 16 September | 30/31 (30.428) | শরৎ (Shôrôd); Autumn | September–October | Kanya |
| কার্তিক | Kartik | 30 | 30 | 17 October | 29/30 (29.879) | হেমন্ত (Hemonto); Dry season | October–November | Tula |
| অগ্রহায়ণ | Ôgrohayon | 30 | 30 | 16 November | 29/30 (29.475) | হেমন্ত (Hemonto); Dry season | November–December | Vrschika |
| পৌষ | Poush | 30 | 30 | 16 December | 29/30 (29.310) | শীত (Sheet); Winter | December–January | Dhanu |
| মাঘ | Magh | 30 | 30 | 15 January | 29/30 (29.457) | শীত (Sheet); Winter | January–February | Makara |
| ফাল্গুন/ ফাগুন | Falgun/ Fagun | 30 / 31 (leap year) | 29 / 30 (leap year) | 14 February | 29/30 (29.841) | বসন্ত (Bôsôntô); Spring | February–March | Kumbha |
| চৈত্র | Choitro | 30 | 30 | 15 March | 30/31 (30.377) | বসন্ত (Bôsôntô); Spring | March–April | Meena |

=== Days ===
The Bengali calendar incorporates the seven-day week as used by many other calendars. The names of the days of the week in the Bengali calendar are based on the Navagraha (Bengali: নবগ্রহ, romanized: nôbôgrôhô). The day begins and ends at sunrise in the Bengali calendar, unlike in the Gregorian calendar, where the day starts at midnight.

According to some scholars, in the calendar originally introduced by Akbar in the year 1584 CE, each day of the month had a different name, but this was cumbersome, and his grandson Shah Jahan changed this to a 7-day week as in the Gregorian calendar, with the week also starting on a Sunday.

| Day name (Bengali) | Romanization | Divine figure/celestial body | Day name (English) | Day name (Sylheti) | Day name (Rohingya) |
|---|---|---|---|---|---|
| রবিবার/ রোববার | Rôbibar/ Robbar | Robi/Sun | Sunday | Roibbár | Rooibar |
| সোমবার | Shombar | Som/Moon | Monday | Shombár | Cómbar |
| মঙ্গলবার | Mônggôlbar | Mongol/Mars | Tuesday | Mongolbár | Mongolbar |
| বুধবার | Budhbar | Budh/Mercury | Wednesday | Budbár | Buidbar |
| বৃহস্পতিবার | Brihôspôtibar | Brihospoti/Jupiter | Thursday | Bishudbár | Bicíbbar |
| শুক্রবার | Shukrôbar | Shukro/Venus | Friday | Shukkurbár | Cúkkurbar |
| শনিবার | Shônibar | Shoni/Saturn | Saturday | Shonibár | Cónibar |

== Traditional and Bangladeshi versions ==
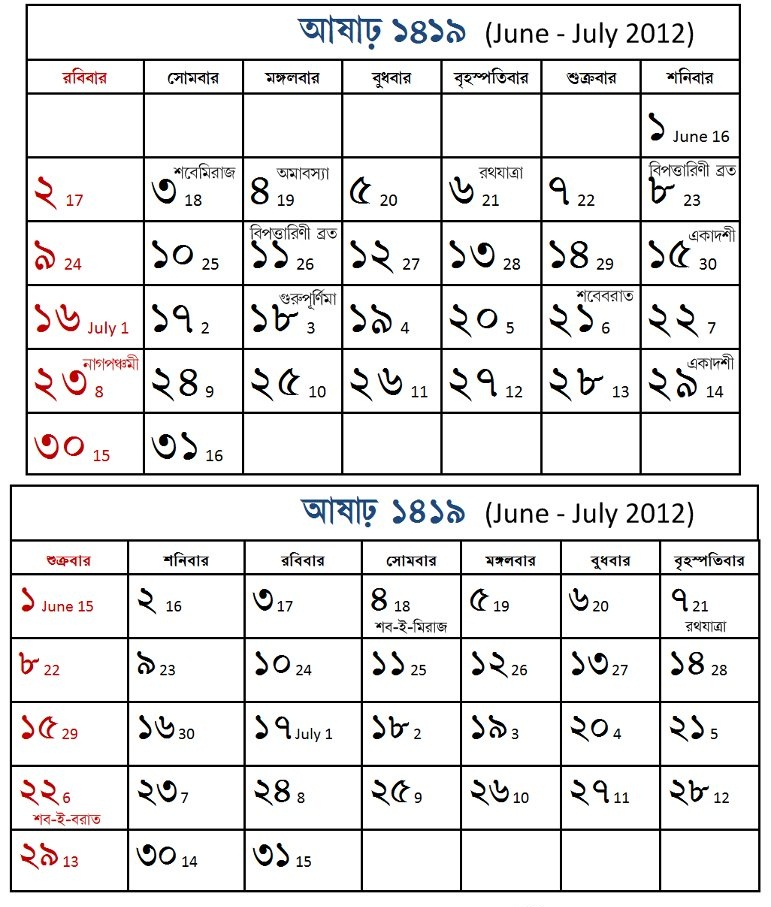
Two versions of the Bengali calendar. Top: the "traditional version" followed in West Bengal and the rest of India; Below: the "Bangladeshi version" followed in Bangladesh.

The current Bengali calendar in the Indian states is based on the Sanskrit text Surya Siddhanta. It retains the historic Sanskrit names of the months, with the first month as Baishakh. Their calendar remains tied to the Hindu calendar system and is used to set the various Bengali Hindu festivals.

In Bangladesh, however, the Bangladeshi national calendar was introduced by drawing from the Bengali calendar in 1966 by a committee headed by Muhammad Shahidullah, making the first five months 31 days long and the rest 30 days each, with the month of Falgun adjusted to 31 days in every leap year. This was officially adopted by Bangladesh in 1987.

== Festivals ==
The following lists major festivals on the Bengali calendar.

=== Poila Boishakh ===
The first day of the month of Boishakh ushers in the Bengali New Year and is known as Poila Boishakh. The festival is similar to New Year's Day, Nowruz, and Songkran.

The Bengali New Year's Day is a public holiday in the Indian states of West Bengal and Tripura, observed on 15 April.

The Bangladeshi New Year, however, is celebrated on 14 April in Bangladesh. In Dhaka, where the Bangladeshi national calendar is followed, the cultural organization Chhayanaut hosts a notable concert in Ramna Park, starting at dawn on 14 April. The Mangal Shobhajatra parades are brought out in many Bangladeshi cities during the festival and are regarded by UNESCO as an intangible cultural heritage.

==== Haal Khata ====
Traders start a new Haal Khata book on Poila Boishakh to keep financial records and settle debts.

=== Spring festival ===
Pohela Falgun and Basanta Utsab are the first day of spring in the Bengali calendar celebrated in Bangladesh and India, respectively.

=== Boli Khela ===
In the Chittagong region of Bangladesh, the Boli khela wrestling matches are organized during the month of Boishakh.

=== Cattle racing ===
Cattle races are a popular activity in Manikganj and Munshiganj districts of Bangladesh during Boishakh.

== See also ==
- Hindu calendar
- Islamic calendar
- Malla calendar
- Indian national calendar
- Roman calendar
- Japanese calendar
