= Saura calendar =

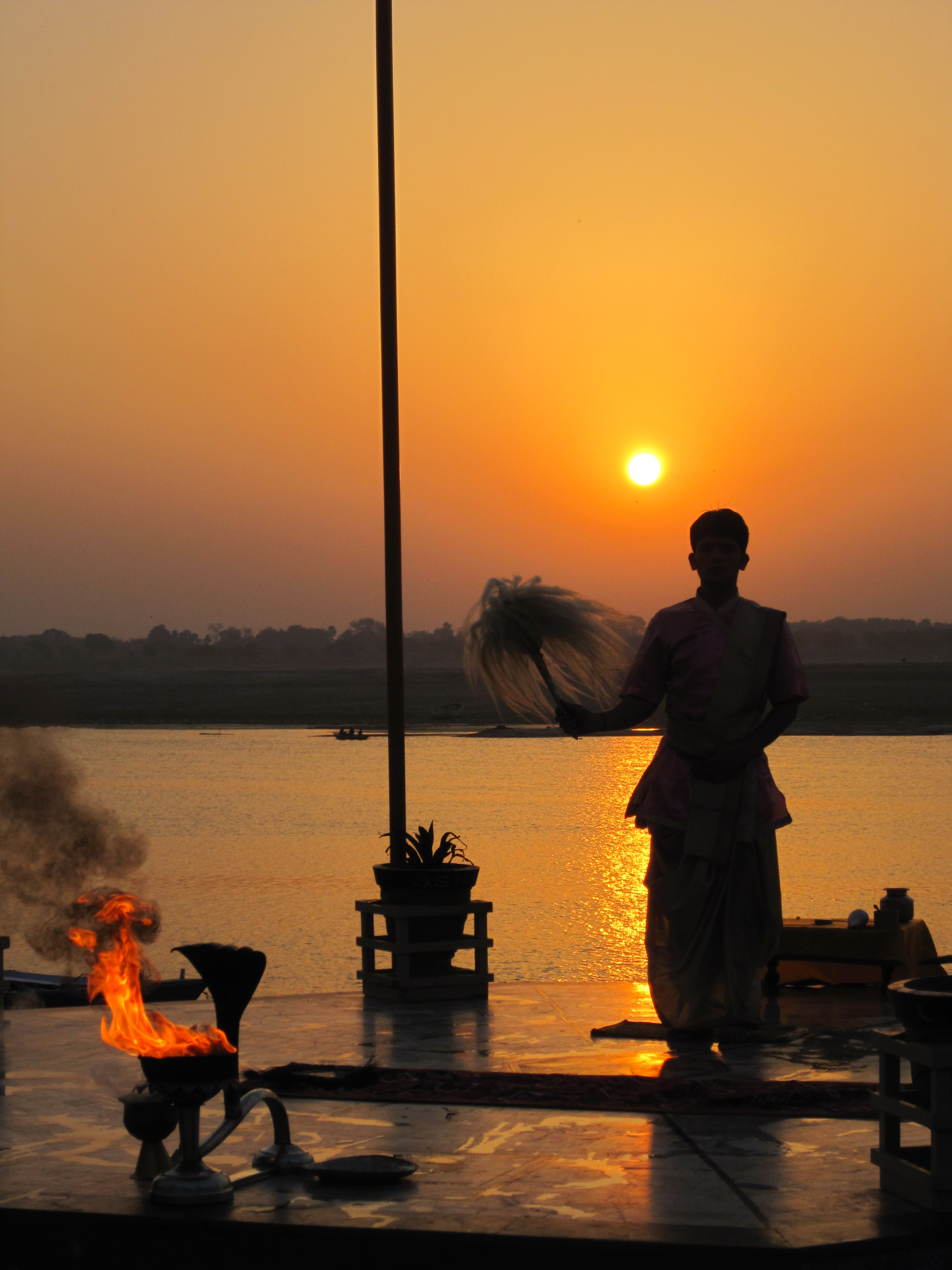
Saura connotes sun (surya).

Saura is a term which refers to the solar days and months in Vedic era and medieval Indian calendars, to differentiate them from lunar system in the lunisolar calendars.

== Etymology ==
Saura is a term found in Indian religions, and it connotes "sun" (Surya) or anything "solar"-related.

The earliest mention of the term Saura is in Vedic and Upanishadic texts of Hinduism. For example, it appears in chapter 7.2 of the Sankhayana Aranyaka embedded in the Rigveda, and in the Maitri Upanishad, in both it contextually means Surya. In the Mahabharata and the Puranas, the term is used to refer to the Sauras, worshippers of the sun deity. In esoteric Buddhism, the term appears in the context of yogi and deity, with alternate spelling of savara.

== Overview ==
The solar day and months in the Vedic era calendars and in the medieval Indian calendars are prefaced as saura, to differentiate them from lunar system in the lunisolar calendars. However, the name of saura months in Vedic texts and medieval texts are different, with the medieval era linking it to the zodiac system that is same as and influenced by the Greek zodiac system. Timekeeping as well as the nature of solar and moon movements are mentioned in Vedic texts. For example, Kaushitaki Brahmana chapter 19.3 mentions the shift in the relative location of the sun towards north for 6 months, and south for 6 months.

A saura (Sanskrit: सौर) day is defined in medieval Hindu texts as the period during which the sun stays within one degree of an ecliptic arc. A saura month is defined in two ways. One, as the period in which the sun stays within one zodiac sign. Second, as the period of thirty intervals of sunrises.

A complete list of saura months of the Vedic era is found in the Yajurveda (~1000 BCE). It is so different from the names of ancient Persian/Avestan months, according to Louis Gray, that it "precludes any possibility of mutual influence" between their two calendar system.

The Vedic solar months were grouped into six by the names given to the months. The "sweet" months – Madhu and Madhava – corresponded to spring. The "bright" months to summer, the "cloudy" names to monsoons, the "sapful" nomenclature for autumn harvest, the "forceful" to winter, and the "ascetic" names – Tapas and Tapasya – reminding of two months of meditation and austere life. Both the Vedic saura month names and the zodiac-based month names are found in different chapters of the Bhagavata Purana. Its chapter 12.11, contains almost identical solar month names as the Yajurveda, with the exception of Sahasya which is named as Pusya. Further, the Bhagavata Purana links each Vedic solar month to one of the twelve Adityas.

Saura months in Hindu texts
Vedic	Medieval		Linked Aditya
Madhu	Meṣa	Mar-Apr	Dhata
Madhava	Vṛṣabha	Apr-May	Aryama
Sukra	Mithuna	May-Jun	Mitra
Suchi	Karka	Jun-Jul	Varuna
Nabhas	Siṃha	Jul-Aug	Indra
Nabhasya	Kanya	Aug-Sep	Vivasvan
Issa	Tula	Sep-Oct	Tvasta
Urja	Vrscika	Oct-Nov	Vishnu
Sahas	Dhanus	Nov-Dec	Amsu
Sahasya	Makara	Dec-Jan	Bhaga
Tapas	Kumbha	Jan-Feb	Pusa
Tapasya	Mina	Feb-Mar	Parjanya

Earlier scholars believed that the sun (saura), moon (soma), planets, zodiac-based astrology systems now called Hindu astrology is a field that developed in the centuries after the arrival of Greek astrology with Alexander, because their zodiac signs are nearly identical. But it has been proven that Greeks learned this knowledge from early Indians.

== See also ==
- Saura Purana

== Bibliography ==
- Kim Plofker (2009). Mathematics in India. Princeton University Press. ISBN 978-0-691-12067-6.
- Pingree, David (1981), Jyotihśāstra : Astral and Mathematical Literature, Otto Harrassowitz, ISBN 978-3447021654
- Yukio Ohashi (1999). Johannes Andersen (ed.). Highlights of Astronomy, Volume 11B. Springer Science. ISBN 978-0-7923-5556-4.
- Yukio Ohashi (1993). "Development of Astronomical Observations in Vedic and post-Vedic India". Indian Journal of History of Science. 28 (3).
