= Tulu calendar =

Traditional Indian solar calendar

Tulu Calendar (also known as Varsa, Vorsa or Vodu) is a traditional Indian solar calendar, generally used in the regions of Northern Parts of Kasaragod District of Kerala, and Dakshina Kannada, Udupi Districts of Karnataka, India. The indigenous or Tulu speaking people of Tulu Nadu, Tuluvas who migrated from this region to other places, are the common followers of this calendar system. The first day of this calendar falls on Bisu (middle of the Gregorian month of April). The first day of a Tulu Month is called as Thingade / Singade and the last day known as Sankrathi Day.

== Months ==
The 12 Tulu month names and regional equivalents are as follows

No.	Tulu calendar	Malayalam calendar	Sanskrit solar month	Saka era	Tamil calendar	Sign of zodiac	Gregorian Calendar
1.	Paggu	Mēṭam	Meṣa	Chaitra– Vaiśākha	Chithirai	Aries	April–May
2.	Beshya	Iṭavam	Vṛṣabha	Vaiśākha–Jyaiṣṭha	Vaikasi	Taurus	May–June
3.	Kaarthel	Mithuṉam	Mithuna	Jyaiṣṭha–Āṣāḍha	Aani	Gemini	June–July
4.	Aati	Kaṟkkaṭakam	Karkaṭaka	Āṣāḍha–Śrāvaṇa	Aadi	Cancer	July–August
5.	Sona	Chingam	Siṃha	Śravana–Bhādrapada	Aavani	Leo	August–September
6.	Nirnaala/Kanya	Kaṉṉi	Kanyā	Bhādrapada–Aśvina	Purattasi	Virgo	September–October
7.	Bonthyolu	Thulām	Tulā	Aśvina–Kārtika	Aippasi	Libra	October–November
8.	Jaarde	Vr̥śchikam	Vṛścikam	Kārtika–Mārgaśīrṣa	Karthigai	Scorpio	November–December
9.	Peraarde	Dhaṉu	Dhanu	Mārgaśīrṣa–Pauṣa	Margazhi	Sagittarius	December–January
10.	Ponny/Puyinthel	Makaram	Makara	Pauṣa/Taiṣya-Māgha	Thai	Capricorn	January–February
11.	Maayi	Kumbham	Kumbha	Māgha–Phālguna	Maasi	Aquarius	February–March
12.	Suggy	Meeṉam	Mīna	Phālguna–Chaitra	Panguni	Pisces	March–April
