= Hindu calendar =

Calendar used for religious purposes

Today (at UTC+00)
- Wednesday, 4 November 2026
- Hindu: Pūrvaphalgunī・Brahman; Solar: 18 Kārtika, 1948 SE; Lunisolar: Daśamī, Kṛishna pakṣa of Āśvina, 2083 VE; Rāudra・5127 KY・1,872,883
Other calendars
Akan	Kuruwukuo
Armenian	17 Trē 1476
Aztec	Atlcahualo 13, 13 Miquiztli
Babylonian	22 Tashritu, 2337 SE
Balinese pawukon	Luang, Pepet, Pasah, Menala, Keliwon, Paniron, Buda of Sinta, Yama, Dangu, Manuh
Bengali	19 Kartik, BS 1433
Chinese	Yang Water Horse・Three Stars Mansion; Fire Horse Year, Month 9, Day 26 (Shuangjiang, 3 days until Lidong)
Common Era	4 November 2026 CE
Coptic	25 Paopi, AM 1743
Egyptian	22 Phamenoth, 2775 NE
Ethiopian	25 Ṭeqemt, 2019 Amätä Məhrät
French Republican	Décade II, Tridi de Brumaire de l'Année 235 de la République
Gregorian	4 November, AD 2026
Hebrew	24 Cheshvan, AM 5787
Icelandic	Miðvikudagur, 12 Gormánuður 2026
Islamic	23 Jumada al-awwal, AH 1448 (using tabular method)
ISO week date	2026-W45-3
Japanese	25 Nagatsuki, Reiwa 8 (Sōkō, 3 days until Rittō)
Julian	22 October, AD 2026 (AM 7535)
Julian day	2461349
Korean	25 Gaedal, 4359 DE
Maya	13.0.14.1.6; 19 Zac, 13 Cimi
Roman	ante diem XI Kalendas Novembres, MMDCCLXXIX AUC
Solar Hijri	13 Aban, SH 1405
Tibetan	25 tha skar, me pho rta 2153 or 1772 or 1000

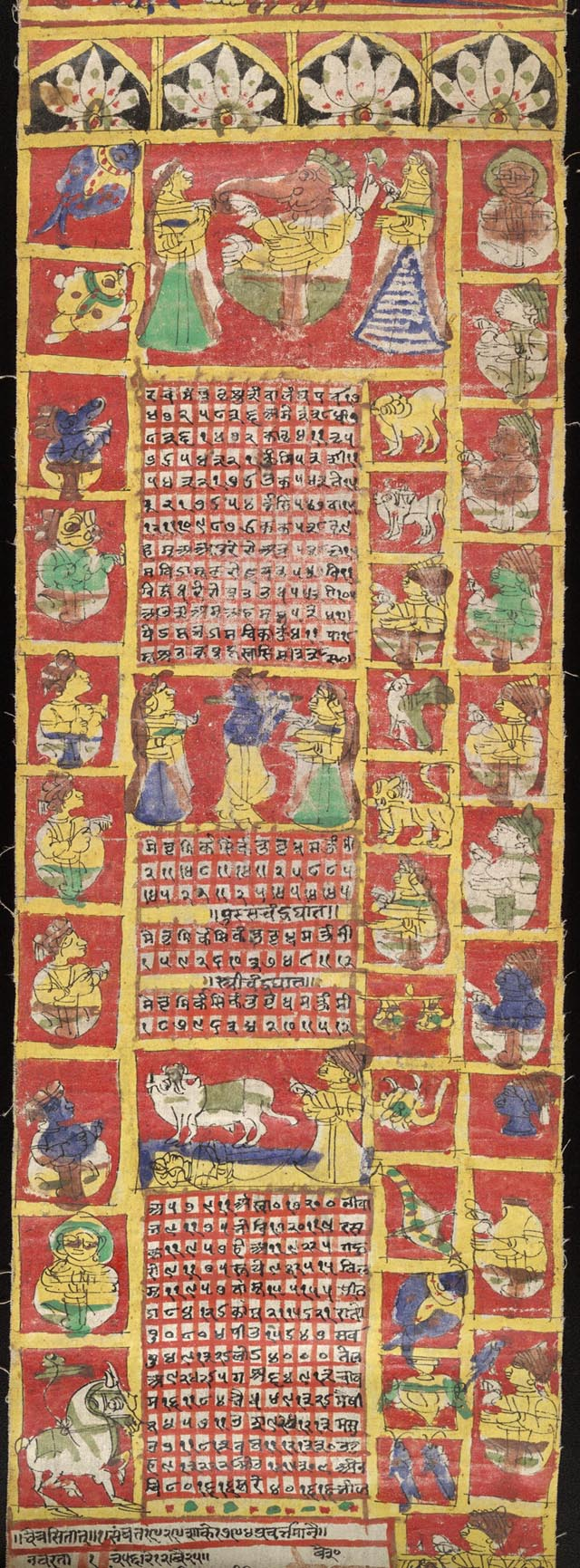
A page from the Hindu calendar 1871–72

The Hindu calendar, also called Panchanga (Sanskrit: पञ्चाङ्ग), is one of various lunisolar calendars that are traditionally used in the Indian subcontinent and Southeast Asia, with further regional variations for social and Hindu religious purposes. They adopt a similar underlying concept for timekeeping based on sidereal year for solar cycle and adjustment of lunar cycles about every 32-33 months, but differ in their relative emphasis to moon cycle or the sun cycle and the names of months and when they consider the New Year to start. Of the various regional calendars, the most studied and known Hindu calendars are the Shalivahana Shaka (associated with the King Shalivahana) found in the Deccan region of Southern India and the Vikram Samvat (Bikrami) found in Nepal and the North and Central regions of India – both of which emphasize the lunar cycle. Their new year starts in spring. In regions such as Tamil Nadu and Kerala, the solar cycle is emphasized and this is called the Tamil calendar (though Tamil Calendar uses month names like in the Hindu Calendar) and Malayalam calendar and these have origins in the second half of the 1st millennium CE. A Hindu calendar is sometimes referred to as Panchangam (पञ्चाङ्गम्), which is also known as Panjika in Eastern India.

The ancient Hindu calendar conceptual design is also found in the Babylonian calendar, the Chinese calendar, and the Hebrew calendar, but different from the Gregorian calendar. Unlike the Gregorian calendar which adds additional days to the month to adjust for the mismatch between twelve lunar cycles (354 lunar days) and approximately 365 solar days, the Hindu calendar maintains the integrity of the lunar month, but inserts an extra full month, once every 32–33 months, to ensure that the festivals and crop-related rituals fall in the appropriate season.

The Hindu calendars have been in use in the Indian subcontinent since Vedic times, and remain in use by the Hindus all over the world, particularly to set Hindu festival dates. Early Buddhist communities of India adopted the ancient Vedic calendar, later Vikrami calendar and then local Buddhist calendars. Buddhist festivals continue to be scheduled according to a lunar system. The Buddhist calendar and the traditional lunisolar calendars of Cambodia, Laos, Myanmar, Sri Lanka and Thailand are also based on an older version of the Hindu calendar. Similarly, the ancient Jain traditions in their calendar have followed the same lunisolar system as the Hindu calendar for festivals, texts and inscriptions. However, the Buddhist and Jain timekeeping systems have attempted to use the Buddha and the Mahavira's lifetimes as their reference points.

The Hindu calendar is also important to the practice of Hindu astrology and zodiac system. It is also employed for observing the auspicious days of deities and occasions of fasting, such as Ekadashi.

== Origins ==
Time keeping

The current year minus one,
multiplied by twelve,
multiplied by two,
added to the elapsed half months of current year,
increased by two for every sixty in the sun,
is the quantity of half-months (Syzygy)).

— Rigveda Jyotisha-vedanga 4
Translator: Kim Plofker

The Vedic culture developed a sophisticated time keeping methodology and calendars for Vedic rituals, and timekeeping as well as the nature of solar and Moon movements are mentioned in Vedic texts. For example, Kaushitaki Brahmana chapter 19.3 mentions the shift in the relative location of the Sun towards north for 6 months, and south for 6 months.

Time keeping was important to Vedic rituals, and Jyotisha was the Vedic era field of tracking and predicting the movements of astronomical bodies in order to keep time, in order to fix the day and time of these rituals. This study is one of the six ancient Vedangas, or ancillary science connected with the Vedas.

Yukio Ohashi states that this Vedanga field developed from actual astronomical studies in the ancient Vedic Period. The texts of Vedic Jyotisha sciences were translated into the Chinese language in the 2nd and 3rd centuries CE, and the Rigvedic passages on astronomy are found in the works of Zhu Jiangyan and Zhi Qian. According to Subhash Kak, the beginning of the Hindu calendar was much earlier. He cites Greek historians describing Maurya kings referring to a calendar which originated in 6676 BCE known as Saptarsi calendar.

The Vikrami calendar is named after king Vikramaditya and starts in 57 BCE.

== Texts ==
Hindu scholars kept precise time by observing and calculating the cycles of Surya (the Sun), Moon and the planets. These calculations about the Sun appear in various astronomical texts in Sanskrit, such as the 5th-century Aryabhatiya by Aryabhata, the 6th-century Romaka by Latadeva and Panca Siddhantika by Varahamihira, the 7th-century Khandakhadyaka by Brahmagupta and the 8th-century Sisyadhivrddida by Lalla. These texts present Surya and various planets and estimate the characteristics of the respective planetary motion. Other texts such as Surya Siddhanta dated to have been completed sometime between the 5th century and 10th century present their chapters on various deified planets with stories behind them.

The manuscripts of these texts exist in slightly different versions. They present Surya, planet-based calculations and Surya's relative motion to Earth. These vary in their data, suggesting that the texts were open and revised over their lives. For example, the 1st millennium CE Hindu scholars calculated the sidereal length of a year as follows, from their astronomical studies, with slightly different results:

Hindu text	Estimated length of the sidereal year
Surya Siddhanta	365 days, 6 hours, 12 minutes, 36.56 seconds
Paulica Siddhanta	365 days, 6 hours, 12 minutes, 36 seconds
Paracara Siddhanta	365 days, 6 hours, 12 minutes, 31.50 seconds
Arya Siddhanta	365 days, 6 hours, 12 minutes, 30.84 seconds
Laghu Arya Siddhanta	365 days, 6 hours, 12 minutes, 30 seconds
Siddhanta Shiromani	365 days, 6 hours, 12 minutes, 9 seconds

The Hindu texts used the lunar cycle for setting months and days, but the solar cycle to set the complete year. This system is similar to the Jewish and Babylonian ancient calendars, creating the same challenge of accounting for the mismatch between the nearly 354 lunar days in twelve months, versus over 365 solar days in a year. They tracked the solar year by observing the entrance and departure of Surya (sun, at sunrise and sunset) in the constellation formed by stars in the sky, which they divided into 12 intervals of 30 degrees each. Like other ancient human cultures, Hindus innovated a number of systems of which intercalary months became most used, that is adding another month every 32.5 months on average. As their calendar keeping and astronomical observations became more sophisticated, the Hindu calendar became more sophisticated with complex rules and greater accuracy.

According to Scott Montgomery, the Siddhanta tradition at the foundation of Hindu calendars predate the Christian era, once had 18 texts of which only 5 have survived into the modern era. These texts provide specific information and formulae on motions of Sun, Moon and planets, to predict their future relative positions, equinoxes, rise and set, with corrections for prograde, retrograde motions, as well as parallax. These ancient scholars attempted to calculate their time to the accuracy of a truti (29.63 microseconds). In their pursuit of accurate tracking of relative movements of celestial bodies for their calendar, they had computed the mean diameter of the Earth, which was very close to the actual 12,742 km (7,918 mi).

Hindu calendars were refined during the Gupta era astronomy by Āryabhaṭa and Varāhamihira in the 5th to 6th century. These, in turn, were based in the astronomical tradition of Vedāṅga Jyotiṣa, which in the preceding centuries had been standardised in a number of (non-extant) works known as Sūrya Siddhānta. Regional diversification took place in the medieval period. The astronomical foundations were further developed in the medieval period, notably by Bhāskara II (12th century).

=== Balinese Hindu calendar ===
Hinduism and Buddhism were the prominent religions of southeast Asia in the 1st millennium CE, prior to the Islamic conquest that started in the 14th century. The Hindus prevailed in Bali, Indonesia, and they have two types of Hindu calendar. One is a 210-day based Pawukon calendar which likely is a pre-Hindu system, and another is similar to lunisolar calendar system found in South India and it is called the Balinese saka calendar which uses Hindu methodology. The names of months and festivals of Balinese Hindus, for the most part, are different, though the significance and legends have some overlap.

== Astronomical basis ==
The Hindu calendar is based on a geocentric model of the Solar System. A large part of this calendar is defined based on the movement of the Sun and the Moon around the Earth (saura māna and cāndra māna respectively). Furthermore, it includes synodic, sidereal, and tropical elements. Many variants of the Hindu calendar have been created by including and excluding these elements (solar, lunar, lunisolar etc.) and are in use in different parts of India.

Elements of the Hindu calendar
	synodic elements	sidereal elements	tropical elements
saura māna		rāśi, sauramāsa, varṣa	uttarāyaṇa, dakṣiṇāyana, devayāna, pitṛyāṇa, ṛtu
cāndra māna	tithi, pakṣa, candramāsa, varṣa		
nākṣatra māna		dina, ghaṭikā (aka nāḍī), vighaṭikā (aka vināḍī), prāṇa (aka asu)	
sāvana māna	dina		

== Year: Samvat ==
Samvat refers to era of the several Hindu calendar systems in Nepal and India, in a similar manner to the Christian era. There are several samvat found in historic Buddhist, Hindu and Jain texts and epigraphy, of which three are most significant: Vikrama era, Old Shaka era and Shaka era of 78 CE.

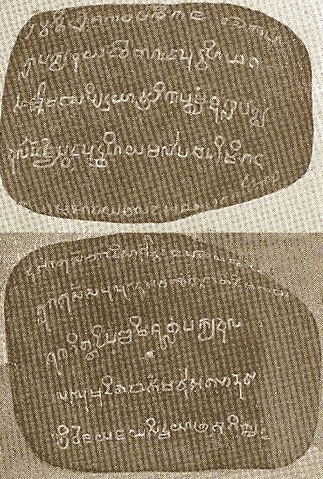
The Hindu calendar saka samvat system is found in Indonesian inscriptions, such as the Kedukan Bukit inscription (pictured above) dated to 604 Śaka, which is equivalent to 682 CE.

- Vikram Samvat (Bikram Sambat): A northern Indian almanac which started in 57 BCE, and is also called the Vikrama Era. It is related to the Bikrami calendar, and is apocryphally linked to Vikramaditya. The year starts from the month of Baishakh / Vaishakha. This system is common in epigraphic evidence from northern, western, central and eastern Indian subcontinent, particularly after the early centuries of the 1st millennium CE.
- Shaka Samvat: There are two Shaka era systems in scholarly use, one is called Old Shaka Era, whose epoch is uncertain, probably sometime in the 1st millennium BCE because ancient Buddhist, Jain and Hindu inscriptions and texts use it. However, the starting point of Old Shaka Era is a subject of dispute among scholars. The second system is called Saka Era of 78 AD, or simply Saka Era, a system that is common in epigraphic evidence from southern India.
- Saka era of Southeast Asia: The Hindu calendar system in Indonesia is attributed to the legend of Hindus arriving with a sage Aji Saka in 1st-century Java, in March 78 CE. Numerous ancient and medieval era texts and inscriptions found in Indonesian islands use this reference year. In mainland southeast Asia, the earliest verifiable use of Hindu Saka methodology in inscriptions is marked Saka 533 in Ankor Borei, which corresponds to 611 CE, while the Kedukan Bukit inscription in Sumatra, containing three dates in Saka 604 (682 CE), is the earliest known use of the Shaka era in the Indonesian islands. However, these inscriptions only set the floruit for the use of the Shaka era in these places, and the Hindu calendar likely existed in southeast Asia before these dates to be used in important monuments. Further, the Hindu calendar system remained popular among the Hindus through to the 15th century, and thereafter in Bali.
- Indian national calendar (modern): combines many Hindu calendars into one official standardized one, but old ones remain in use.

== Months ==
=== Solar months and seasons ===
The Hindu calendar divides the zodiac into twelve divisions called rāśhi ("group, amount, collection"; Hindi: राशि). The Sun appears to move around the Earth through different divisions/constellations in the sky throughout the year, which in reality is actually caused by the Earth revolving around the Sun. The rāśis have 30° each and are named for constellations found in the zodiac.

The time taken by the Sun to transit through a rāśi is a solar month whose name is identical to the name of the rāśi. In practice, solar months are mostly referred as rāśi (not months).

The solar months are named differently in different regional calendars. While the Malayalam calendar broadly retains the phonetic Sanskrit names, the Bengali and Tamil calendars repurpose the Sanskrit lunar month names (Chaitra, Vaishaka etc.) as follows:

- The Tamil calendar replaces Mesha, Vrisha etc. with Chithirai, Vaigasi etc.
- The Bengali calendar is similar to the Tamil calendar except in that it starts the year with Boiśākh (instead of Choitrô), followed by Jyoisthô etc. The Assamese and Odia calendars too are structured the same way.

The solar months (rāśi) along with their equivalent names in the Bangali, Malayalam and Tamil calendar are given below:

Hindu Solar Zodiac and Months
#	English/Latin	Sanskrit	Sanskrit meaning	Assamese	Bengali	Kashmiri	Malayalam	Odia	Tamil	Tulu	Gregorian
1	Aries	Meṣa	ram	ব’হাগ (Böhag)	বৈশাখ (Boiśākh)	میٖش (mīsh)	മേടം (Mēḍaṃ)	ବୈଶାଖ (Baiśākha)	சித்திரை (Śittirai)	Paggu	April–May
2	Taurus	Vṛṣabha	bull	জেঠ (Zeth)	জ্যৈষ্ঠ (Jyoisthô)	ورٛیش (vrēsh)	ഇടവം (Iḍavaṃ)	ଜ୍ୟେଷ୍ଠ (Jyēṣṭha)	வைகாசி (Vaigāsi)	Beshya	May–June
3	Gemini	Mithuna	twins	আহাৰ (Ahar)	আষাঢ় (Āsādh)	مؠتھُن (myathun)	മിഥുനം (Mithunaṃ)	ଆଷାଢ଼ (Āṣāḍha)	ஆனி (Āṉi)	Kaarthel	June–July
4	Cancer	Karkaṭa	crab	শাওণ (Xaün)	শ্রাবণ (Śrābôṇ)	کَرکَٹھ (karkaṭh)	കർക്കടകം (Karkkaṭakam)	ଶ୍ରାବଣ (Śrābaṇa)	ஆடி (Āḍi)	Aati	July–August
5	Leo	Siṃha	lion	ভাদ (Bhado)	ভাদ্র (Bhādrô)	سِہَم (siham)	ചിങ്ങം (Ciṅṅaṃ)	ଭାଦ୍ରବ (Bhādraba)	ஆவணி (Āvaṇi)	Sōna	August–September
6	Virgo	Kanyā	girl	আহিন (Ahin)	আশ্বিন (Āśhshin)	کَنؠ (kan')	കന്നി (Kanni)	ଆଶ୍ୱିନ (Āśvina) or ଅଶିଣ (Aśiṇa)	புரட்டாசி (Puraṭṭāsi)	Nirnaal	September–October
7	Libra	Tulā	scales	কাতি (Kati)	কার্তিক (Kārtik)	تول (tōl)	തുലാം (Tulāṃ)	କାର୍ତ୍ତିକ (Kārttika)	ஐப்பசி (Aippasi)	Bonthel	October–November
8	Scorpio	Vṛścika	scorpion	আঘোণ (Aghün)	অগ্রহায়ণ (Ôgrôhāyôn)	ورِٛچَکھ (vrichakh)	വൃശ്ചികം (Vr̥ścikaṃ)	ମାର୍ଗଶିର (Mārgaśira) or ମଗୁଶୁର (Maguśura)	கார்த்திகை (Kārttigai)	Jaarde	November–December
9	Sagittarius	Dhanus	archery bow	পুহ (Puh)	পৌষ (Poush)	دَن (dan)	ധനു (Dhanu)	ପୌଷ (Pauṣa) or ପୁଷ (Puṣa)	மார்கழி (Mārgaḻi)	Perarde	December–January
10	Capricorn	Makara	sea monster	মাঘ (Magh)	মাঘ (Māgh)	مَکَر (makar)	മകരം (Makaram)	ମାଘ (Māgha)	தை (Tai)	Puyinthel	January–February
11	Aquarius	Kumbha	water pot	ফাগুন (Phagun)	ফাল্গুন (Phālgun) or ফাগুন (Phagun)	کۄمب (kọmb)	കുംഭം (Kumbham)	ଫାଲ୍‌ଗୁନ (Phālguna) or ଫଗୁଣ (Phaguṇa)	மாசி (Māsi)	Maayi	February–March
12	Pisces	Mīna	fish	চ’ত (Söt)	চৈত্র (Choitrô)	میٖن (mīn)	മീനം (Mīnaṃ)	ଚୈତ୍ର (Chaitra)	பங்குனி (Paṅguṉi)	Suggi	March–April

The solar months (rāśi) along with the approximate correspondence to Hindu seasons (Ṛtu) and Gregorian months are:

Rāśi	Sidereal signs	Gregorian months	Ṛtu (season)	Ṛtu in Devanagari script	Bengali name for Ṛtu	Gujarati name for Ṛtu	Kannada name for Ṛtu	Kashmiri name for Ṛtu	Malayalam name for Ṛtu	Odia name for Ṛtu	Tamil name for Ṛtu	Telugu name for Ṛtu	Tibetan name for Ṛtu	Kalachakra tantra Tibetan-name for Ṛtu
Mīna Meṣa	♓ ♈	Mid March– Mid May	Vasanta (Spring)	वसन्त	বসন্ত (Bôsôntô)	વસંત ઋતુ (Vasaṃta r̥tu)	ವಸಂತ ಋತು (Vasaṃta Ṛtu)	سونٛتھ [sõ:tʰ]	വസന്തം (Vasantam)	ବସନ୍ତ (Basanta)	இளவேனில் (ilavenil)	వసంత ఋతువు (Vasaṃta Ṛtuvu)	དཔྱིད་ར་བ་དང་དཔྱིད་བར་མ (shid rawa, thang, shid warma)	དཔྱིད་ཀ (shid ka)
Vṛṣabha Mithuna	♉ ♊	Mid May– Mid July	Grīṣma (Summer)	ग्रीष्म	গ্রীষ্ম (Grishsho)	ગ્રીષ્મ ઋતુ (Grīṣma r̥tu)	ಗ್ರೀಷ್ಮ ಋತು (Grīṣma Ṛtu)	گرٛێشِم [greʃim]	ഗ്രീഷ്മം (Grīṣmam)	ଗ୍ରୀଷ୍ମ (Grīṣma)	முதுவேனில் (mudhuvenil)	గ్రీష్మ ఋతువు (Grīṣma Ṛtuvu)	དཔྱིད་ཐ་མ་དང་དབྱར་ར་བ། (shid dama, thang, yar rawa)	སོ་ག(soga)
Karkaṭa Siṃha	♋ ♌	Mid July– Mid Sep	Varṣā (Monsoon)	वर्षा	বর্ষা (Bôrsha)	વર્ષા ઋતુ (Varṣa r̥tu)	ವರ್ಷ ಋತು (Varṣa Ṛtu)	ؤہراتھ [wəhraːtʰ]	വർഷം (Varsham)	ବର୍ଷା (Barṣā)	கார் (kaar)	వర్ష ఋతువు (Varṣa Ṛtuvu)	དབྱར་བར་མ་དང་དབྱར་ཐ་མ (yarwarma, thang, yardama)	དབྱར་ག (yarka)
Kanyā Tulā	♍ ♎	Mid Sep– Mid Nov	Śarad (Autumn)	शरद्	শরৎ(Shôrôt)	શરદ ઋતુ (Śarad r̥tu)	ಶರದೃತು (Śaradṛtu)	ہَرُد [harud]	ശരത്ത് (Śarat)	ଶରତ (Śarata)	கூதிர் (kūdir)	శరదృతువు (Śaradṛtuvu)	སྟོན་ར་བ་དང་སྟོན་བར་མ (ston rawa, thang, ston warma)	སྟོན་ཁ (stonka)
Vṛścika Dhanu	♏ ♐	Mid Nov– Mid Jan	Hemanta (Pre-Winter)	हेमन्त	হেমন্ত (Hemôntô)	હેમંત ઋતુ (Hēmaṃta r̥tu)	ಹೇಮಂತ ಋತು (Hēmaṃta Ṛtu)	وَنٛدٕ [wandɨ]	ഹേമന്തം (Hēmaṃtam)	ହେମନ୍ତ (Hemanta)	முன்பனி (munpani)	హేమంత ఋతువు (Hēmaṃta Ṛtuvu)	སྟོན་ཐ་མ་དང་དགུན་ར་བ (ston da ma, thang, dgun rawa)	དགུན་སྟོད (dgun stod)
Makara Kumbha	♑ ♒	Mid Jan– Mid March	Śiśira (Winter)	शिशिर	শীত (Śeet)	શિશિર ઋતુ (Śiśira r̥tu)	ಶಿಶಿರ ಋತು (Śiśira Ṛtu)	شِشُر [ʃiʃur]	ശിശിരം (Śiśiram)	ଶୀତ/ଶିଶିର (Śīta/Śiśira)	பின்பனி (pinpani)	శిశిర ఋతువు (Śiśira Ṛtuvu)	དགུན་བར་མ་དང་དགུན་ཐ་མ (dgun warma, thang, dgun dama)	དགུན་སྨད (dgun smad)

The names of the solar months are also used in the Darian calendar for the planet Mars.

=== Lunar months ===
Lunar months are defined based on lunar cycles, i.e. the regular occurrence of new moon and full moon and the intervening waxing and waning phases of the moon.

==== Paksha ====
A lunar month contains two fortnights called pakṣa (पक्ष, literally "side"). One fortnight is the bright, waxing half where the moon size grows and it ends in the full moon. This is called "Gaura Paksha" or Shukla Paksha. The other half is the darkening, waning fortnight which ends in the new moon. This is called "Vadhya Paksha" or Krishna Paksha. The Hindu festivals typically are either on or the day after the full moon night or the darkest night (amavasya, अमावास्या), except for some associated with Krishna, Durga or Rama. The lunar months of the hot summer and the busy major cropping-related part of the monsoon season typically do not schedule major festivals.

==== Amānta and Purnimānta systems ====
Two traditions have been followed in the Indian subcontinent with respect to lunar months: the amānta tradition, which ends the lunar month on the new moon day and the purnimānta tradition, which ends on the full moon day. As a consequence, in the amanta tradition, Shukla paksha precedes Krishna paksha in every lunar month, whereas in the purnimānta tradition, Krishna paksha precedes Shukla paksha in every lunar month. Hence, Shukla paksha will always belong to the same month in both traditions, whereas Krishna paksha will always be associated with different but succeeding months in each tradition.

Variations in the naming of lunar months
	Krishna Paksha	Shukla Paksha	Krishna Paksha
Amānta	Phālguna	Chaitra	
Purnimānta	Chaitra		Vaishākha

The amanta (also known as Amāvasyānta or Mukhyamana) tradition is followed by most Indian states that have a peninsular coastline (except Assam, West Bengal, Odisha, Tamil Nadu and Kerala, which use their own solar calendars). These states are Gujarat, Maharashtra, Goa, Karnataka, Andhra Pradesh and Telangana. Nepal and most Indian states north of the Vindhya mountains follow the poornimānta (or Gaunamana) tradition.

The poornimānta tradition was being followed in the Vedic era. It was replaced with the amanta tradition as the Hindu calendar system prior to the 1st century BCE, but the Poornimanta tradition was restored in 57 BCE by king Vikramaditya, who wanted to return to the Vedic roots. The presence of this system is one of the factors considered in dating ancient Indian manuscripts and epigraphical evidence that have survived into the modern era.

The two traditions of Amanta and Purnimanta systems have led to alternate ways of dating any festival or event that occurs in a Krishna paksha in the historic Hindu, Buddhist or Jain literature, and contemporary regional literature or festival calendars. For example, the Hindu festival of Maha Shivaratri falls on the fourteenth lunar day of Magha's Krishna paksha in the Amanta system, while the same exact day is expressed as the fourteenth lunar day of Phalguna's Krishna paksha in the Purnimanta system. Both lunisolar calendar systems are equivalent ways of referring to the same date, and they continue to be in use in different regions, though the Purnimanta system is now typically assumed as implied in modern Indology literature if not otherwise specified.

==== List ====
The names of the Hindu months vary by region. Those Hindu calendars which are based on lunar cycle are generally phonetic variants of each other, while the solar cycle are generally variants of each other too, suggesting that the timekeeping knowledge travelled widely across the Indian subcontinent in ancient times.

During each lunar month, the Sun transits into a sign of the zodiac (sankranti). The lunar month in which the Sun transits into Mesha is named Chaitra and designated as the first month of the lunar year.

A few major calendars are summarized below:

Lunar calendar month names in different Hindu calendars
Vikrami (lunar)	Sankranti	Awadhi	Bhojpuri	Hindi	Kannada	Kashmiri	Maithili	Marathi	Meitei	Nepali	Punjabi	Sindhi	Telugu	Tulu	Tibetan	Gregorian
Caitra	Mīna	𑂒𑂶𑂞, chait	𑂒𑂶𑂞, chait	चैत/चैत्र	ಚೈತ್ರ (chaitra)	ژِتھٕر [t͡sitʰɨr]	𑒔𑒻𑒞𑒱 (chait)	चैत्र	ꯂꯝꯇꯥ, camta	चैत(chait)	ਚੇਤ, chēt	چيٽُ, chēṭu	చైత్రము (chaitramu)	suggi	ནག་པ་ཟླ་བ	March–April
Vaiśākha	Meṣa	𑂥𑂶𑂮𑂰𑂎, baisākh	𑂥𑂶𑂮𑂰𑂎, baisākh	बैसाख/वैशाख	ವೈಶಾಖ (vaisākha)	وَہؠکھ [ʋahʲakʰ] or بیساکھ [beːsaːkʰ]	𑒥𑒻𑒮𑒰𑒐 (baishakh)	वैशाख	ꯁꯖꯤꯕꯨ, sajibu	वैशाख (baishākh)	ਵਸਾਖ, vasākh	ويساکُ, vēsāku or وِهاءُ, vihāu	వైశాఖము (vaiśākhamu)	paggu	ས་ག་ཟླ་བ	April–May
Jyeṣṭha	Vṛṣa	𑂔𑂵𑂘, jeṭh	𑂔𑂵𑂘, jeṭh	जेठ/ज्येष्ठ	ಜ್ಯೇಷ್ಠ (jyeshta)	زیٹھ [zeːʈʰ]	𑒖𑒹𑒚 (jeth)	ज्येष्ठ	ꯀꯥꯂꯦꯟ, kalen	जेठ(jēṭh)	ਜੇਠ, jēṭh	ڄيٺُ, jjēṭhu	జ్యేష్ఠము(jyēsṭhamu)	bēsha	སྣྲོན་ཟླ་བ	May–June
Āṣāḍha	Mithuna	𑂄𑂮𑂰𑂜, āsār̤h	𑂄𑂮𑂰𑂜, āsār̤h	असाढ़/आषाढ	ಆಷಾಢ (āshāda)	ہار [haːr]	𑒁𑒮𑒰𑒜𑓃 (asadh)	आषाढ	ꯏꯉꯥ, eenga	असार (asār)	ਹਾੜ੍ਹ, hāṛh	آکاڙُ, ākhāṛu or آهاڙُ, āhāṛu	ఆషాఢము (āṣāḍhamu)	kārte	ཆུ་སྟོད་ཟླ་བ	June–July
Śrāvaṇa	Karka	𑂮𑂰𑂫𑂢, sāwan	𑂮𑂰𑂫𑂢, sāwan	सावन/श्रावण	ಶ್ರಾವಣ (shrāvana)	شرٛاوُن [ʃraːʋun]	𑒮𑒰𑒍𑒢 (saon)	श्रावण	ꯏꯉꯦꯟ, eengen	साउन (sāun)	ਸਾਓਣ, sāoṇ	سانوَڻُ, sānvaṇu	శ్రావణము (śrāvaṇamu)	aaṭi	གྲོ་བཞིན་ཟླ་བ	July–August
Bhādrapada	Siṃha	𑂦𑂰𑂙𑂸, bhādau	𑂦𑂰𑂠𑂷, bhādo	भादों/भाद्रपद	ಭಾದ್ರಪದ (bhādrapada)	بٲدٕرپؠتھ [bəːdɨrpʲatʰ]	𑒦𑒰𑒠𑒼 (bhado)	भाद्रपद	ꯊꯧꯋꯥꯟ, thouwan	भदौ (bhadau)	ਭਾਦੋਂ, bhādōn	بَڊو, baḍo or بَڊرو, baḍro	భద్రపదము (bhadrapadamu)	sona	ཁྲིམས་སྟོད་ཟླ་བ	August–September
Aśvin	Kanyā	𑂍𑂳𑂀𑂫𑂰𑂚, kuvār	𑂄𑂮𑂱𑂢, āsin	आसिन/आश्विन	ಆಶ್ವಯುಜ (āswayuja)	ٲشِد [əːʃid]	𑒂𑒮𑒱𑒢 (aasin)	आश्विन	ꯂꯥꯡꯕꯟ, langban	असोज (asoj)	ਅੱਸੂ, assū	اَسُو, asū	ఆశ్వయుజము (āśvayujamu)	kanya/nirnāl	ཐ་སྐར་ཟླ་བ	September–October
Kārttika	Tulā	𑂍𑂰𑂞𑂱𑂍, kātik	𑂍𑂰𑂞𑂱𑂍, kātik	का(र्)तिक	ಕಾರ್ತೀಕ (kārtika)	کارتِکھ [kaːrtikʰ]	𑒏𑒰𑒞𑒱𑒏 (katik)	कार्तिक	ꯃꯦꯔꯥ, mera	कात्तिक (kāttik)	ਕੱਤਕ, kattak	ڪَتِي, katī	కార్తికము (kārtikamu)	bontel	སྨིན་དྲུག་ཟླ་བ	October–November
Mārgaśīrṣa	Vṛśchika	𑂃𑂏𑂯𑂢, agahan	𑂃𑂏𑂯𑂢, agahan	अघन/अग्रहायण, मँगसिर/मार्गशीर्ष	ಮಾರ್ಗಶಿರ (mārgasira)	مَنٛجہۆر [mand͡ʒhor]	𑒁𑒑𑒯𑒢 (agahan)	मार्गशीर्ष	ꯍꯤꯌꯥꯡꯀꯩ, heeyangkei	मंसिर (mangsir)	ਮੱਘਰ, magghar	ناهرِي, nāhrī or مَنگهِرُ, manghiru	మార్గశిరము (mārgaśiramu)	jārde	མགོ་ཟླ་བ	November–December
Pauṣa	Dhanu	𑂣𑂴𑂮, pūs	𑂣𑂴𑂮, pūs	पूस/पौष	ಪುಷ್ಯ (pushya)	پوہ [poːh] or پۄہ [pɔh]	𑒣𑒴𑒮 (poos)	पौष	ꯄꯣꯢꯅꯨ, poinu	पुष (puṣ)	ਪੋਹ, poh	پوهُه, pohu	పుష్యము (puṣyamu)	perarde	རྒྱལ་ཟླ་བ	December–January
Māgha	Makara	𑂧𑂰𑂐, māgh	𑂧𑂰𑂐, māgh	माघ	ಮಾಘ (magha)	ماگ [maːɡ]	𑒧𑒰𑒒 (magh)	माघ	ꯋꯥꯛꯆꯤꯡ, wakching	माघ (magh)	ਮਾਘ, māgh	مانگھُه, mānghu	మాఘము (māghamu)	puyintel	མཆུ་ཟླ་བ	January–February
Phālguna	Kumbha	𑂤𑂰𑂏𑂳𑂢, fāgun	𑂤𑂰𑂏𑂳𑂢, fāgun	फा(ल्)गुन	ಫಾಲ್ಗುಣ (phalguna)	پھاگُن [pʰaːɡun]	𑒤𑒰𑒑𑒳𑒢 (fagun)	फाल्गुण	ꯐꯥꯢꯔꯦꯜ, fairel	फागुन (phagun)	ਫੱਗਣ, phaggaṇ	ڦَڳُڻُ, phaguṇu	ఫాల్గుణము (phālguṇamu)	māyi	དབོ་ཟླ་བ	February–March

=== Corrections between lunar and solar months ===
The astronomical basis of the Hindu lunar months. Also illustrates Adhika Masa (Year 2-Bhadrapada) repeats; the first time the Sun moves entirely within Simha Rashi thus rendering it an Adhika Masa

Twelve Hindu mas (māsa, lunar month) are equal to approximately 354 days, while the length of a sidereal (solar) year is about 365 days. This creates a difference of about eleven days, which is offset every (29.53/10.63) = 2.71 years, or approximately every 32.5 months. Purushottam Maas or Adhika Maas is an extra month that is inserted to keep the lunar and solar calendars aligned. The twelve months are subdivided into six lunar seasons timed with the agriculture cycles, blooming of natural flowers, fall of leaves, and weather. To account for the mismatch between lunar and solar calendar, the Hindu scholars adopted intercalary months, where a particular month just repeated. The choice of this month was not random, but timed to sync back the two calendars to the cycle of agriculture and nature.

The repetition of a month created the problem of scheduling festivals, weddings and other social events without repetition and confusion. This was resolved by declaring one month as Shudha (pure, clean, regular, proper, also called Deva month) and the other Mala or Adhika (extra, unclean and inauspicious, also called Asura month).

The Hindu mathematicians who calculated the best way to adjust the two years, over long periods of a yuga (era, tables calculating 1000s of years), they determined that the best means to intercalate the months is to time the intercalary months on a 19-year cycle, similar to the Metonic cycle used in the Hebrew calendar. This intercalation is generally adopted in the 3rd, 5th, 8th, 11th, 14th, 16th and 19th year of this cycle. Further, the complex rules rule out the repetition of Mārgaśīrṣa (also called Agrahayana), Pausha and Magha lunar months. The historic Hindu texts are not consistent on these rules, with competing ideas flourishing in the Hindu culture.

==== Rare corrections ====
The Hindu calendar makes further rare adjustments, over a cycle of centuries, where a certain month is considered kshaya month (dropped). This occurs because of the complexity of the relative lunar, solar and earth movements. Underhill (1991) describes this part of Hindu calendar theory: "when the sun is in perigee, and a lunar month being at its longest, if the new moon immediately precedes a sankranti, then the first of the two lunar months is deleted (called nija or kshaya)." This, for example, happened in the year 1 BCE, when there was no new moon between Makara sankranti and Kumbha sankranti, and the month of Pausha was dropped.

Typically there is a gap of at least 141 years between two instances of kshaya maasa. But the 20th century saw a rare instance of two kshaya months separated by 19 years. After the kshaya of Paush maas in 1822-23, Margasheersha failed to occur in 1963-64. Then in the Hindu year spanning 1982-83, Maagha did not occur. A kshaya mass is typically accompanied by an adhik maas; this adhik maas may begin within, before of after, 75 days of the dropped (kshaya or loap) maas. Next scheduled kshaya maas is Paush, in January 2124.

== Day ==
Just like months, the Hindu calendar has two measures of a day, one based on the lunar movement and the other on solar. The solar (saura) day or civil day, called divasa (दिवस), has been what most Hindus traditionally use, is easy and empirical to observe, with or without a clock, and it is defined as the period from one sunrise to another. The lunar day is called tithi (तिथि), and this is based on complicated measures of lunar movement. A lunar day or tithi may, for example, begin in the middle of an afternoon and end next afternoon. Both these days do not directly correspond to a mathematical measure for a day such as equal 24 hours of a solar year, a fact that the Hindu calendar scholars knew, but the system of divasa was convenient for the general population. The tithi have been the basis for timing rituals and festivals, while divasa for everyday use. The Hindu calendars adjust the mismatch in divasa and tithi, using a methodology similar to the solar and lunar months.

A tithi is technically defined in Vedic texts, states John E. Cort, as "the time required by the combined motions of the Sun and Moon to increase (in a bright fortnight) or decrease (in a dark fortnight) their relative distance by twelve degrees of the zodiac. These motions are measured using a fixed map of celestial zodiac as reference, and given the elliptical orbits, a duration of a tithi varies between 21.5 and 26 hours, states Cort. However, in the Indian tradition, the general population's practice has been to treat a tithi as a solar day between one sunrise to next.

A lunar month has 30 tithi. The technical standard makes each tithi contain different number of hours, but helps the overall integrity of the calendar. Given the variation in the length of a solar day with seasons, and the Moon's relative movements, the start and end time for tithi varies over the seasons and over the years, and the tithi adjusted to sync with divasa periodically with intercalation.

=== Weekday/Vāsara ===
Vāsara refers to the weekdays in Sanskrit. Also referred to as Vara and used as a suffix. The correspondence between the names of the week in Hindu and other Indo-European calendars are exact. This alignment of names probably took place sometime during the 3rd century CE. The weekday of a Hindu calendar has been symmetrically divided into 60 ghatika, each ghatika (24 minutes) is divided into 60 pala, each pala (24 seconds) is subdivided into 60 vipala, and so on.

Names of the weekdays in different languages
No.	Sanskrit	Latin weekday	Celestial object	Assamese	Awadhi	Bengali	Bhojpuri	Gujarati	Hindi	Kannada	Kashmiri	Konkani	Malayalam	Maithili	Marathi	Meitei (Manipuri)	Nepali	Odia	Punjabi (Hindus and Sikhs) (Note: Punjabi Muslims use Urdu/Arabic words for Friday / Saturday etc.)	Sindhi	Tamil	Telugu	Urdu	Balinese	Cham
1	Ravivāsara रविवासर or Surya vāsara आदित्य वासर	Sunday/dies Solis	Ravi, Aditya = Sun	Dêûbār/Rôbibār দেওবাৰ/ৰবিবাৰ	Itvār 𑂅𑂞𑂫𑂰𑂩	Rôbibār রবিবার	Etwār 𑂉𑂞𑂫𑂰𑂩	Ravivār રવિવાર	Ravivār रविवार	Bhānuvāra ಭಾನುವಾರ	[aːtʰʋaːr] آتھوار	etār 𑂉𑂞𑂫𑂰𑂩	Njaayar ഞായർ	Ravidin 𑒩𑒫𑒱𑒠𑒱𑒢	Ravivāra रविवार	Nongmaijing ꯅꯣꯡꯃꯥꯏꯖꯤꯡ	Aaitabar आइतवार	Rabibāra ରବିବାର	Aitvār ਐਤਵਾਰ	Ācharu آچَرُ or Ārtvāru آرتوارُ	Nyayiru/Gnayiru ஞாயிறு	Ādivāraṁ ఆదివారం	Itvār اتوار	Redite ᬋᬤᬶᬢᭂ	Adit
2	Somavāsara सोमवासर or Indu vāsara इन्दु वासर	Monday/dies Lunae	Soma (deity), Chandra = Moon	Xûmbār সোমবাৰ	Summār 𑂮𑂳𑂧𑂧𑂰𑂩	Śombār সোমবার	Somār 𑂮𑂷𑂧𑂰𑂩	Sōmavār સોમવાર	Somavār सोमवार	Sōmavāra ಸೋಮವಾರ	[t͡səndrɨʋaːr] ژٔنٛدرٕوار	Somaar सोमार	Thinkal തിങ്കൾ	Somdin 𑒮𑒼𑒧𑒠𑒱𑒢	Somavāra सोमवार	Ningthoukaba ꯅꯤꯡꯊꯧꯀꯥꯕ	Sombar सोमवार	Somabāra ସୋମବାର	Somavār ਸੋਮਵਾਰ	Sūmaru سُومَرُ	Thingal திங்கள்	Sōmavāraṁ సోమవారం	Somvār سوموار or Pīr پیر	Soma ᬲᭀᬫ	Thom
3	Maṅgalavāsara मङ्गलवासर or Bhaumavāsara भौम वासर	Tuesday/dies Martis	Maṅgala = Mars	Môṅôlbār/Môṅgôlbār মঙলবাৰ/মঙ্গলবাৰ	Maṅgār 𑂧𑂁𑂏𑂰𑂩	Môṅgôlbār মঙ্গলবার	Maṅar 𑂧𑂑𑂩	Maṅgaḷavār મંગળવાર	Maṅgalavār मंगलवार	Maṁgaḷavāra ಮಂಗಳವಾರ	[boːmʋaːr] بوموار or [bɔ̃ʋaːr] بۄنٛوار	Mangaḷār मंगळार	Chovva ചൊവ്വ	Maṅgaldin 𑒧𑓀𑒑𑒪𑒠𑒱𑒢	Maṅgaḷavāra मंगळवार	Leipakpokpa ꯂꯩꯄꯥꯛꯄꯣꯛꯄ	Mangalbar मङ्गलवार	Maṅgaḷabāra ମଙ୍ଗଳବାର	Maṅgalavār ਮੰਗਲਵਾਰ	Mangalu مَنگلُ or Angāro اَنڱارو	Chevvai செவ்வாய்	Maṁgaḷavāraṁ మంగళవారం	Mangal منگل	Anggara ᬳᬂᬕᬭ	Angar
4	Budhavāsara बुधवासर or Saumya vāsara सौम्य वासर	Wednesday/dies Mercurii	Budha = Mercury	Budhbār বুধবাৰ	Budh 𑂥𑂳𑂡	Budhbār বুধবার	Buddh 𑂥𑂳𑂡	Budhavār બુધવાર	Budhavāra बुधवार	Budhavāra ಬುಧವಾರ	[bɔdʋaːr] بۄدوار	Budhavār बुधवार	Budhan ബുധൻ	Budhdin 𑒥𑒳𑒡𑒠𑒱𑒢	Budhavāra बुधवार	Yumsakeisa ꯌꯨꯝꯁꯀꯩꯁ	Budhabar बुधवार	Budhabāra ବୁଧବାର	Buddhavār ਬੁੱਧਵਾਰ	Budharu ٻُڌَرُ or Arbā اَربع	Budhan புதன்	Budhavāraṁ బుధవారం	Budh بدھ	Buda ᬩᬸᬤ	But
5	Guruvāsara गुरुवासर or Brhaspati vāsara बृहस्पतिवासर	Thursday/dies Iovis/Jupiter	Deva-Guru Bṛhaspati = Jupiter	Brihôspôtibār বৃহস্পতিবাৰ	Bipphai 𑂥𑂱𑂣𑂤𑂶	Brihôśpôtibār বৃহস্পতিবার	Biphe/Biyaphe 𑂥𑂱𑂤𑂵 / 𑂥𑂱𑂨𑂤𑂵	Guruvār ગુરુવાર	Guruvār गुरुवार or Brihaspativāra बृहस्पतिवार	Guruvāra ಗುರುವಾರ	[brasʋaːr] برَٛسوار or [brʲasʋaːr] برٛؠسوار	Birestār बिरेस्तार	Vyaazham വ്യാഴം	Brihaspatidin 𑒥𑒵𑒯𑒮𑓂𑒣𑒞𑒲𑒠𑒱𑒢	Guruvāra गुरुवार	Sagolsen ꯁꯒꯣꯜꯁꯦꯟ	Bihibar बिहीवार	Gurubāra ଗୁରୁବାର	Vīravār ਵੀਰਵਾਰ	Vispati وِسپَتِ or Khamīsa خَميِسَ	Vyazhan வியாழன்	Guruvāraṁ, Br̥haspativāraṁ గురువారం, బృహస్పతివారం, లక్ష్మీవారం	Gurūvār گرووار or Jume'rāt جمعرات	Wrespati ᬯ᭄ᬭᭂᬲ᭄ᬧᬢᬶ	Jip
6	Śukravāsara शुक्रवासर or bhṛguvāsarah भृगुवासर	Friday/dies Veneris	Śukra = Venus	Xukurbār/Xukrôbār শুকুৰবাৰ/শুক্রবাৰ	Sūk 𑂮𑂴𑂍	Śukrôbār শুক্রবার	Sūk 𑂮𑂴𑂍	Śukravār શુક્રવાર	Śukravār शुक्रवार	Śukravāra ಶುಕ್ರವಾರ	[ʃokurʋaːr] شۆکُروار or [jumaːh] جُمعہ	Shukrār शुक्रार	Velli വെള്ളി	Śukradin 𑒬𑒳𑒏𑓂𑒩𑒠𑒱𑒢	Śukravāra शुक्रवार	Eerai ꯏꯔꯥꯢ	Sukrabar शुक्रवार	Śukrabāra ଶୁକ୍ରବାର	Śukkaravār ਸ਼ੁੱਕਰਵਾਰ	Śukru شُڪرُ or Jum'o جُمعو	Velli வெள்ளி	Śukravāraṁ శుక్రవారం	Śukarvār شکروار or Juma'a جمع	Sukra ᬲᬸᬓ᭄ᬭ	Suk
7	Śanivāsara शनिवासर or Sthiravāsarah स्थिरवासर	Saturday/dies Saturnis	Śani = Saturn	Xônibār শনিবাৰ	Sanīcar 𑂮𑂢𑂲𑂒𑂩	Śônibār শনিবার	Sanichchar 𑂮𑂢𑂱𑂒𑂹𑂒𑂩	Śanivār શનિવાર	Śanivār शनिवार	Śanivāra ಶನಿವಾರ	[baʈɨʋaːr] بَٹہٕ وار	Shenvār शेनवार	Shani ശനി	Śanidin 𑒬𑒢𑒲𑒠𑒱𑒢	Śanivāra शनिवार	Thangja ꯊꯥꯡꯖ	Sanibar शनिवार	Śanibāra ଶନିବାର	Śanīvār ਸ਼ਨੀਵਾਰ or Śaniccharvār ਸ਼ਨਿੱਚਰਵਾਰ or Saniccharvār ਸਨਿੱਚਰਵਾਰ or Sanīvār ਸਨੀਵਾਰ	Chancharu ڇَنڇَرُ or Śanscharu شَنسچَرُ	Shani சனி	Śanivāraṁ శనివారం	Sanīchar سنیچر or Haftah ہفتہ	Saniscara ᬲᬦᬶᬲ᭄ᬘᬭ	Thanchar

The term -vāsara is often realised as vāra or vaar in Sanskrit-derived and influenced languages. There are many variations of the names in the regional languages, mostly using alternate names of the celestial bodies involved.

=== Five limbs of time ===
The complete Vedic calendars contain five angas or parts of information: lunar day (tithi), solar day (diwas), asterism (naksatra), planetary joining (yoga) and astronomical period (karanam). This structure gives the calendar the name Panchangam. The first two are discussed above.

==== Yoga ====
See the main article on yoga.

The Sanskrit word Yoga means "union, joining, attachment", but in astronomical context, this word means latitudinal and longitudinal information. The longitude of the Sun and the longitude of the Moon are added, and normalised to a value ranging between 0° to 360° (if greater than 360, one subtracts 360). This sum is divided into 27 parts. Each part will now equal 800' (where ' is the symbol of the arcminute which means 1/60 of a degree). These parts are called the yogas. They are labelled:

Orbital simulation illustrating the calculation of nityayoga

1. Viṣkambha
2. Prīti
3. Āyuśmān
4. Saubhāgya
5. Śobhana
6. Atigaṇḍa
7. Sukarma
8. Dhrti
9. Śūla
10. Gaṇḍa
11. Vṛddhi
12. Dhruva
13. Vyāghatā
14. Harṣaṇa
15. Vajra
16. Siddhi
17. Vyatipāta
18. Variyas
19. Parigha
20. Śiva
21. Siddha
22. Sādhya
23. Śubha
24. Śukla
25. Brahma
26. Māhendra
27. Vaidhṛti

Again, minor variations may exist. The yoga that is active during sunrise of a day is the prevailing yoga for the day.

==== Karaṇa ====
A karaṇa is half of a tithi. To be precise, a karaṇa is the time required for the angular distance between the Sun and the Moon to increase in steps of 6° starting from 0°. (Compare with the definition of a tithi.)

Since the tithis are 30 in number, and since 1 tithi = 2 karaṇas, therefore one would logically expect there to be 60 karaṇas. But there are only 11 such karaṇas which fill up those slots to accommodate for those 30 tithis. There are actually 4 "fixed" (sthira) karaṇas and 7 "repeating" (cara) karaṇas.

The 4 "fixed" karaṇas are:

1. Śakuni (शकुनि)
2. Catuṣpāda (चतुष्पाद)
3. Nāga (नाग)
4. Kiṃstughna (किंस्तुघ्न)

The 7 "repeating" karaṇas are:

1. Vava or Bava (बव)
2. Valava or Bālava (बालव)
3. Kaulava (कौलव)
4. Taitila or Taitula (तैतिल)
5. Gara or Garaja (गरज)
6. Vaṇija (वणिज)
7. Viṣṭi (Bhadra) (भद्रा)
- Now the first half of the 1st tithi (of Śukla Pakṣa) is always Kiṃtughna karaṇa. Hence this karaṇa is "fixed".
- Next, the 7-repeating karaṇas repeat eight times to cover the next 56 half-tithis. Thus these are the "repeating" (cara) karaṇas.
- The 3 remaining half-tithis take the remaining "fixed" karaṇas in order. Thus these are also "fixed" (sthira).
- Thus one gets 60 karaṇas from those 11 preset karaṇas.

The Vedic day begins at sunrise. The karaṇa at sunrise of a particular day shall be the prevailing karaṇa for the whole day.

==== Nakshatra ====
Nakshatras are divisions of ecliptic, each 13° 20', starting from 0° Aries.

== Festival calendar: Solar and Lunar dates ==
Many holidays in the Hindu, Buddhist and Jaina traditions are based on the lunar cycles in the lunisolar timekeeping with foundations in the Hindu calendar system. A few holidays, however, are based on the solar cycle, such as the Vaisakhi, Pongal and those associated with Sankranti. The dates of the lunar cycle based festivals vary significantly on the Gregorian calendar and at times by several weeks. The solar cycle based ancient Hindu festivals almost always fall on the same Gregorian date every year and if they vary in an exceptional year, it is by one day.

== Regional variants ==
The Hindu Calendar Reform Committee, appointed in 1952, identified more than thirty well-developed calendars, in use across different parts of India.

Variants include the lunar emphasizing Vikrama, and the Shalivahana calendars, as well as the solar emphasizing Tamil calendar and Malayalam calendar. The two calendars most widely used today are the Vikrama calendar, which is in followed in western and northern India and Nepal, the Shalivahana Shaka calendar which is followed in the Deccan region of India (Comprising present day Indian states of Telangana, Andhra Pradesh, Karnataka, Maharashtra, and Goa).

=== Lunisolar ===
Calendars based on lunar cycle (lunar months in solar year, lunar phase for religious dates and new year):

- Vikram Samvat (lunisolar)
  - Vikrami era – North and Central India (Lunar)
  - Gujarati samvat – Gujarat, Rajasthan
  - Sindhi calendar – Sindhis
- Shalivahana (Shaka) calendar – Used in Deccan region states of Maharashtra, Goa, Karnataka, Andhra Pradesh, Telangana
  - Telugu Calendar - Andhra Pradesh and Telangana
  - Kannada Calendar - Karnataka
  - Marathi Calendar - Maharastra
- Saptarishi calendar – Kashmiri Pandits
- Meitei calendar – Manipur
- Nepali calendar – Nepal, Sikkim (Newar)
- Punjabi calendar – Punjab
- Tibetan calendar – Tibet, Ladakh, Himachal Pradesh (Spiti), Sikkim, Arunachal Pradesh (Monpa)

=== Solar ===
Calendars based on solar cycle (solar months in solar year, lunar phase for religious dates but new year which falls on solar date – South and Southeast Asian solar New Year):

- Assamese calendar – Assam
- Bengali calendar – West Bengal, Bangladesh, Assam (Barak Valley), Tripura
- Odia calendar – Odisha
- Tirhuta calendar – Bihar (Maithils)
- Tripuri calendar – Tripura
- Malayalam calendar – Kerala
- Tamil calendar – Tamil Nadu
- Tulu calendar – Karnataka (Tulus)
- Vikram Samvat (solar) – Nepal, Sikkim
- Theravada Buddhist calendar – Arunachal Pradesh (Khamti, Singpho, other Tais)
- Burmese calendar – Tripura (Mog)

=== Other related calendars across India and Asia ===
- Indian national calendar – used by Indian Government (civil calendar based on solar months)
- Vira Nirvana Samvat (Lunar) – Jain
- Pawukon calendar – Bali
- Balinese saka calendar (Lunar) – Bali
- Cham calendar (Lunar) – Chams
- Chula Sakarat (Lunar) – Myanmar
- Thai solar calendar – Thailand
- Thai lunar calendar – Thailand
- Khmer calendar (Lunar & Solar) – Cambodia

== See also ==
- Astronomical basis of the Hindu calendar – Applied astronomy of ancient India
- Ekadashi – Eleventh day of the lunar fortnight
- Hindu astrology – Indian form of astrology
- Hindu units of measurement
- Hindu units of time
- Hinduism – Range of Indian religious traditions
- List of Hindu Empires and Dynasties
- List of Hindu festivals
- Lunar phase (Hinduism) – Religious significance of lunar phases
- Malayalam calendar – Sidereal solar calendar used by the Malayali people
  - Kollam era
- Panchangam – Traditional Hindu calendar
- Panjika – Hindu astronomical almanac
- Sankranti – Transmigration of the sun in Hindu astronomy
