= Ṛtú =

Sanskrit word referring to a fixed or appointed time

Ritu (Sanskrit: ऋतु, romanized: ṛtú, lit. 'period') in Vedic Sanskrit refers to a fixed or appointed time, especially the proper time for sacrifice (yajna) or ritual in Vedic Religion.

The word is so used in the Rigveda, the Yajurveda and the Atharvaveda. In Classical Sanskrit, it refers to an epoch or period, especially one of the six seasons or ritus in the Hindu calendar.

It is also the name of a Rishi and of the 12th Manu.

Rtu in its diverse meanings can also be associated with food as is described in the Rig Veda Mandala 1 Hymn 15.

A notion derived from this is that of ritu or season(s) of the year, in the number of 6.

== See also ==
- Ṛta
- Kairos
- Vedic priesthood
- Kāla (time)
- Ritu (season)
