= VRSA =

VRSA may refer to:

- Vancomycin-resistant Staphylococcus aureus, a strain of the bacterium Staphylococcus aureus.
- Vila Real de Santo António Municipality, a city and municipality in the Algarve, Portugal.
- Vrsa or Vṛṣabha, a month in the Hindu calendar and a zodiac in Hindu astrology (equivalent to Taurus)
