= Kuchela dinam =

Hindu Malayali observance

Kuchelan dinam (Malayalam: കുചേല ദിനം, lit. 'Kuchela day') is an annual festival celebrated by Hindus in Kerala. It is observed on the first Wednesday of the month of Dhanu in the Malayalam calendar.

== Description ==
In the Bhagavata Purana, Kuchela (Sudama) is a childhood friend of Krishna who offers a gift of beaten rice (aval) to the deity despite his poverty. Following the offering, he becomes wealthy because of the benevolent blessings of Krishna. Several temples in South India, including the famous Guruvayur Temple observe the Kuchela dinam in remembrance of Kuchela's willingness to part his food despite his penury. Devotees offer specially prepared beaten rice in Krishna temples on this occasion. The offering is known as aval nivedyam and contains grated coconut, jaggery, ghee, dried ginger, and cumin in addition to beaten rice. Special counters are opened at temples from the eve of Kuchela dinam to facilitate aval nivedyam. In Guruvayur temple, devotees line up outside the temple and offer packets of beaten rice at the namaskara mandapam situated in front of the sanctum sanctorum and the steps leading to the shrine called thripadi. Devotees believe that poverty is eradicated and will be blessed with prosperity after aval nivedyam.
