= Phalguna =

Eleventh month of the Hindu calendar

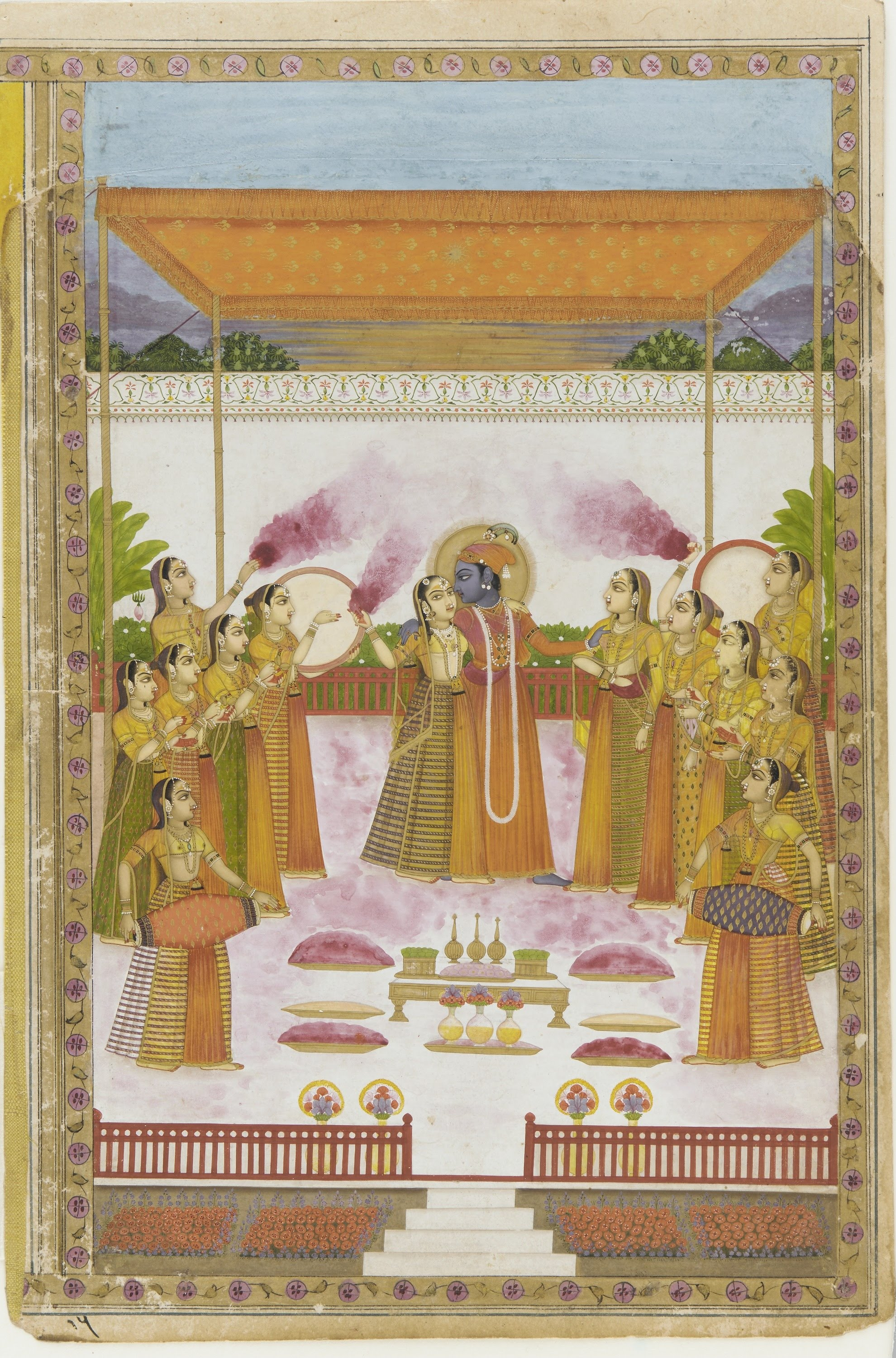
- Krishna and Radha celebrating Holi, the Hindu festival of colours
- Native name: फाल्गुन (Sanskrit)
- Calendar: Hindu calendar
- Month number: 12 (Note: In a normal lunar calendar year, Phalguna is the twelfth and last month. In Hindu calendar, an additional month Adhika-masa is added approximately every three years to keep the lunar calendar aligned with the solar calendar.)
- Number of days: 29 or 30
- Season: Shishira (Winter)
- Gregorian equivalent: February–March
- Significant days: Holi; Maha Shivaratri; Panguni Uthiram; Shigmo

Phalguna or Phagun is the twelfth and last month of the Hindu lunar calendar and the Indian national calendar. The name of the month is derived from the position of the Moon near the Pushya nakshatra (star) on the full moon day. The month corresponds to the end of the winter (Shishira) season and falls in February–March of the Gregorian calendar.

In the Hindu solar calendar, it corresponds to the month of Kumbha and begins with the Sun's entry into Aquarius. It corresponds to Falgun, the eleventh month in the Bengali calendar and Vikram Samvat. In the Tamil calendar, it corresponds to the twelfth and last month of Panguni, falling in the Gregorian months of March–April. In the Vaishnav calendar, it corresponds to the twelfth month of Govinda. (Note: In a normal Vaishnav calendar year, Govinda is the twelfth and last month. An additional intercalary month of Purusottama is added in some years to keep it aligned with the solar calendar.)

In the Hindu lunar calendar, each month has 29 or 30 days. The month begins on the next day after Amavasya (new moon) or Purnima (full moon) as per amanta and purnimanta systems respectively. A month consists of two cycles of 15 days each, Shukla Paksha (waxing moon) and Krishna Paksha (waning moon). Days in each cycle is labeled as a thithi, with each thithi repeating twice in a month.

== Festivals ==
=== Holi ===
Holi is a Hindu festival celebrated to mark the end of winter and the arrival of spring (Vasanta). It celebrates various events from Hindu mythology including the love between god Krishna and his consort Radha. It symbolises the victory of good over evil and includes the ritual of lighting bonfires (Holika Dahan) the night before. The bonfire is lit to symbolise the burning away of evil, and is attributed to the event in which Prahalada is saved by god Vishnu from a fire lit by demoness Holika, who is made to instead burn in it. The festival involves throwing coloured powders (gulal) and coloured water, with each colour carrying symbolic meanings.

=== Maha Shivaratri ===
Maha Shivaratri is a major Hindu Shaiva festival celebrated on Chaturdashi (14th lunar night) thithi of Krishna Paksha (waning moon) of the month. It is dedicated to worshipping lord Shiva. The festival commemorates several events from Hindu mythology associated with Shiva including his union with Parvati. People remain awake the entire night, while offering prayers, chanting mantras and performing various rituals.

=== Panguni Uthiram ===
Panguni Uthiram is a Tamil festival that falls on the day when the Nakshatra (star) of Uttiram aligns with purnima (full moon day) in the Tamil month of Panguni. The day commemorates the divine marriages of Hindu deities such as Shiva and Parvati, Murugan and Deivanai, and Vishnu and Lakshmi. It also marks the day of manifestation of lord Ayyappan. On the day, special rituals, processions and marriage ceremonies of gods are conducted across Hindu temples.

=== Shigmo ===
Shigmo is a spring-festival celebrated by agricultural communities in the state of Goa. The festival marks the onset of spring and the upcoming harvest season. The festival features various folk dances accompanies by music and parades.

== See also ==
- Astronomical basis of the Hindu calendar
- Hindu astrology
- Hindu calendar
- Indian astronomy
- Indian units of measurement
