= Mithuna (month) =

Month in Indian lunisolar calendars

Mithuna is a month in the Indian solar calendar. It corresponds to the zodiacal sign of Gemini, and overlaps with about the second half of June and about the first half of July in the Gregorian calendar.

In Vedic texts, the Mithuna month is called Shukra (IAST: Śukra), but in these ancient texts it has no zodiacal associations. The solar month of Mithuna overlaps with its lunar month Ashadha, in Hindu lunisolar calendars. The Mithuna marks the start of the monsoon season on the Indian subcontinent, and is preceded by the solar month of Vrsabha, and followed by the solar month of Karkaṭa.

The Mithuna month is called Ani in the Tamil Hindu calendar. The ancient and medieval era Sanskrit texts of India vary in their calculations about the duration of Mithuna, just like they do with other months. For example, the Surya Siddhanta calculates the duration of Mithuna to be 31 days, 15 hours, 28 minutes and 24 seconds. In contrast, the Arya Siddhanta calculates the duration of the Mithuna month to be 31 days, 14 hours, 34 minutes and 24 seconds.

Mithuna is also an astrological sign in Indian horoscope systems, corresponding to Gemini (astrology).

Mithuna is also the fourteenth month in the Darian calendar for the planet Mars, when the Sun traverses the western sector the constellation Gemini as seen from Mars.
