= Kumbha (month) =

Month in Indian lunisolar calendars

Kumbha is a month in the Indian solar calendar. It corresponds to the zodiacal sign of Aquarius, and overlaps with about the second half of February and about the first half of March in the Gregorian calendar.

In Vedic texts, the Kumbha month is called Tapas (IAST: Tapas), but in these ancient texts it has no zodiacal associations. The solar month of Kumbha overlaps with its lunar month Phalguna, in Hindu lunisolar calendars. The Kumbha marks the end of winter for the Indian subcontinent. It is preceded by the solar month of Makara, and followed by the solar month of Mīna. The solar month is significant because it inspires the name of the 12-year cycled Kumbha Mela, where Hindu pilgrims gather by tens of millions to one of four pilgrimage sites, in the weeks before it starts.

The Kumbha month is called Masi in the Tamil Hindu calendar. The ancient and medieval era Sanskrit texts of India vary in their calculations about the duration of Kumbha, just like they do with other months. For example, the Surya Siddhanta calculates the duration of Kumbha to be 29 days, 19 hours, 41 minutes and 12 seconds. In contrast, the Arya Siddhanta calculates the duration of the Kumbha month to be 29 days, 19 hours, 24 minutes and 0 seconds.

Kumbha is also an astrological sign in Indian horoscope systems, corresponding to Aquarius (astrology).

Kumbha is also the sixth month in the Darian calendar for the planet Mars, when the Sun traverses the eastern sector of the constellation Aquarius as seen from Mars.
