= Mina (month) =

Month in Indian lunisolar calendars

Mīna, or Meena, is a month in the Indian solar calendar. It corresponds to the zodiacal sign of Pisces, and overlaps with about the later half of March and about the early half of April in the Gregorian calendar. First day of the Meena month, called as Meena Sankranti generally falls on March 14.

In Vedic texts, the Mina month is called Tapasya (IAST: Tapasya), but in these ancient texts it has no zodiacal associations. The solar month of Mina overlaps with its lunar month Chaitra, in Hindu lunisolar calendars. The Mina marks the spring season for the Indian subcontinent. It is preceded by the solar month of Kumbha, and followed by the solar month of Meṣa.

The Mina month is called Panguni in the Tamil Hindu calendar, and is its last month in the traditional calendar. The ancient and medieval era Sanskrit texts of India vary in their calculations about the duration of Mina, just like they do with other months. For example, the Surya Siddhanta calculates the duration of Mina to be 30 days, 8 hours, 29 minutes and 1 second. In contrast, the Arya Siddhanta calculates the duration of the Mina month to be 30 days, 8 hours, 7 minutes and 42 seconds.

The Indian solar month names are significant in epigraphical studies of South Asia. For example, the Mina month, along with other solar months are found inscribed in medieval era temples. The Mina month is found inscribed in Chola Empire monuments.

Mina (literally, fish) is also an astrological sign in Indian horoscope systems, corresponding to Pisces (astrology).

Mina is also the eighth month in the Darian calendar for the planet Mars, when the Sun traverses the central sector of the constellation Pisces as seen from Mars.
