= Mesha (month) =

Month in Indian lunisolar calendars

Meṣa, or Mesha (मेष), is a first month in the Hindu solar calendar. It corresponds to the zodiacal sign of Aries, and overlaps with about the second half of April and about the first half of May in the Gregorian calendar. Generally Mesha month starts on 13th or 14th of April, called as Mesha Sankranti.

In Vedic texts, the Mesa month is called Madhu (IAST: Madhu), but in these ancient texts, it has no zodiacal associations. The solar month of Mesha overlaps with its lunar month Vaisakha, in Hindu lunisolar calendars. The Mesha is preceded by the solar month of Mīna, and followed by the solar month of Vṛṣabha.

The Mesha month is called Chittirai in the Tamil calendar and is its first month. The ancient and medieval era Sanskrit texts of India vary in their calculations about the duration of Mesha, just like they do with other months. For example, the Surya Siddhanta calculates the duration of Mesha to be 30 days, 22 hours, 26 minutes and 48 seconds. In contrast, the Arya Siddhanta calculates the duration of Mesha to be 30 days 22 hours 12 minutes.

Mesha is also an astrological sign in Indian horoscope systems, corresponding to Aries.

Mesha is also the tenth month in the Darian calendar for the planet Mars, when the Sun traverses the central sector of the constellation Aries as seen from Mars.
