= Vṛścika =

Month in Indian lunisolar calendars

Vṛścik‌‌‌a (वृश्चिक), also referred to as Vrishchika or Vrschika, is a month in the Indian solar calendar. It corresponds to the zodiacal sign of Scorpio, and approximately overlaps with the later half of November and first half of December in the Gregorian calendar.

In Vedic texts, the Vrscika month is called Urja (IAST: Ūrja), with which a female goddess is also associated called Urja but in these ancient texts it has no zodiacal associations. The solar month of Vrschika overlaps with its lunar month Agahana or Mangsir, in Hindu lunisolar calendars. The Vrschika marks the end of the autumn season and the start of the winter on the Indian subcontinent, and is preceded by the solar month of Tulā, and followed by the solar month of Dhanu.

The Vrschika month is called Kartigai in the Tamil Hindu calendar. The ancient and medieval era Sanskrit texts of India vary in their calculations about the duration of Vrschika, just like they do with other months. For example, the Surya Siddhanta calculates the duration of Vrschika to be 29 days, 11 hours, 46 minutes and 0 seconds. In contrast, the Arya Siddhanta calculates the duration of the Vrschika month to be 29 days, 12 hours, 12 minutes and 24 seconds.

The Indian solar month names are significant in epigraphical studies of South Asia. For example, Vrischika month, along with other solar months are found inscribed in medieval era temples. The Vrischika month, along with the other months, is found inscribed in Chola Empire monuments.

Vrschika is also an astrological sign in Indian horoscope systems, corresponding to Scorpio (astrology).

Vrishika is also the twenty-fourth month in the Darian calendar for the planet Mars, when the Sun traverses the western sector of the constellation Ophiuchus as seen from Mars.
