= Makara (month) =

Month in Indian lunisolar calendars

Makara is a month in the Indian solar calendar. It corresponds to the zodiacal sign of Capricorn, and overlaps with about the later half of January and approximately early half of February in the Gregorian calendar.

In Vedic texts, the Makara month is called Sahasya (IAST: Sahasya), but in these ancient texts it has no zodiacal associations. The solar month of Makara overlaps with its lunar month Magha, in Hindu lunisolar calendars. The Makara marks the month with lengthening day lengths on the Indian subcontinent. It is preceded by the solar month of Dhanu, and followed by the solar month of Kumbha. The start of this month is almost always January 14, the day of the Makara Sankranti festival, and periodically the Kumbh Mela.

The Makara month is called Tai in the Tamil Hindu calendar. The ancient and medieval era Sanskrit texts of India vary in their calculations about the duration of Makara, just like they do with other months. For example, the Surya Siddhanta calculates the duration of Vrschika to be 29 days, 10 hours, 45 minutes and 12 seconds. In contrast, the Arya Siddhanta calculates the duration of the Vrschika month to be 29 days, 10 hours, 57 minutes and 35 seconds.

Makara (crocodile or half animal-half fish being) is also an astrological sign in Indian horoscope systems, corresponding to Capricorn (astrology).

Makara is also the fourth month in the Darian calendar for Mars, when the Sun the Sun traverses the eastern sector of the constellation Capricornus as seen from Mars.
