= Kanya =

Month in Indian lunisolar calendars

Kanyā is one of the twelve months in the Indian solar calendar.

Kanya corresponds to the zodiacal sign of Virgo, and overlaps with about the second half of September and about the first half of October in the Gregorian calendar. In Vedic texts, the Kanya month is called Nabhasya (IAST: Nabhasya), but in these ancient texts it has no zodiacal associations. The solar month of Kanya overlaps with its lunar month Ashvin, in Hindu lunisolar calendars. It marks the start of harvests and festival season across the Indian subcontinent. It is preceded by the solar month of Siṃha, and followed by the solar month of Tulā.

The Kanya month is called Purattasi in the Tamil Hindu calendar. The ancient and medieval era Sanskrit texts of India vary in their calculations about the duration of Kanya, just like they do with other months. For example, the Surya Siddhanta, dated to c. 400 CE, calculates the duration of Kanya to be 30 days, 10 hours, 35 minutes and 36 seconds. In contrast, the Arya Siddhanta calculates the duration of the Kanya month to be 30 days, 10 hours, 57 minutes and 36 seconds.

The Indian solar month names are significant in epigraphical studies of South Asia. For example, Kanya month, along with other solar months, are found inscribed in medieval era Hindu temples.

Kanya is also an astrological sign in Indian horoscope systems, corresponding to Virgo (astrology).

Kanya is also the twentieth month in the Darian calendar for the planet Mars, when the Sun traverses the eastern part of the constellation Virgo as seen from Mars.
