= Tula (month) =

Month in the Indian lunisolar calendar

Tulā is one of the twelve months in the Indian solar calendar.

Tula corresponds to the zodiacal sign of Libra, and overlaps with about the second half of October and about the first half of November in the Gregorian calendar. In Vedic texts, the Tula month is called Issa (IAST: Issa), but in these ancient texts it has no zodiacal associations. The solar month of Tula overlaps with its lunar month Kartika, in Hindu lunisolar calendars. The Tula marks the end of monsoon harvests, a period of cooler autumn, a break before the winter crop, and many annual festivals and fairs set by the lunar cycle are observed in and about this part of the calendar across the Indian subcontinent. It is preceded by the solar month of Kanyā, and followed by the solar month of Vṛścik‌‌‌a. The sun, according to the Hindu texts, begins it southward journey and days begin to get shorter.

The Tula month is called Aipassi in the Tamil Hindu calendar. The ancient and medieval era Sanskrit texts of India vary in their calculations about the duration of Tula, just like they do with other months. For example, the Surya Siddhanta, dated to c. 400 CE, calculates the duration of Tula to be 29 days, 21 hours, 26 minutes and 24 seconds. In contrast, the Arya Siddhanta calculates the duration of the Tula month to be 29 days, 21 hours, 40 minutes and 48 seconds.

The Indian solar month names are significant in epigraphical studies of South Asia. For example, Tula month, along with other solar months, are found inscribed in medieval era Hindu temples.

Tula is also an astrological sign in Indian horoscope systems, corresponding to Libra (astrology).
