= Dhanu (month) =

Month in Indian lunisolar calendars

Dhanu, Dhanus or Dhanurmasa (धनुर्मास) is a month in the Hindu calendar, Malayalam calendar and others. It corresponds to the zodiacal sign of Sagittarius, and overlaps with approximately the second half of December and about the first half of January in the Gregorian calendar.

== Other names ==
In Vedic texts, the Dhanus month is called Sahas (IAST: Sahas), but in these ancient texts it has no zodiacal associations. The solar month of Dhanu overlaps with its lunar month Pausha, in Hindu lunisolar calendars. The Dhanu marks the winter season for the Indian subcontinent. It is preceded by the solar month of Vṛścika, and followed by the solar month of Makara.

The Dhanus month is called Margazhi in the Tamil Hindu calendar. The ancient and medieval era Sanskrit texts of India vary in their calculations about the duration of Dhanus, just like they do with other months. For example, the Surya Siddhanta calculates the duration of Vṛścika to be 29 days, 7 hours, 37 minutes and 36 seconds. In contrast, the Arya Siddhanta calculates the duration of the Vṛścika to be 29 days, 8 hours, 24 minutes and 48 seconds.

Dhanurmas or Dhanur Masa is also known by the names Chapa Mas, Kodanda Mas, Karmuka Mas etc. Chapa, Kodanda, Karmuka etc., in Sanskrit are synonyms of Dhanus; meaning a bow. It is the month of margashira and so also called Margazhi masam in Tamil. Lord Sri Krishna says in Bhagavad-gita, 'Maasanam Margashirshoham' ... meaning 'Among the months, I am Margashira'. Dhanurmasa is also called as Shoonya Masa because it is generally advised not to conduct anything other than godly and holy functions.

== Astrological sign ==
Dhanu is also an astrological sign in Indian horoscope systems, corresponding to Sagittarius (astrology).

== Etymology and significance ==
This period of month is considered as highly auspicious for Vishnu devotees. Old Hindu scriptures have set apart this month to be completely focused on devotional activities. Other non-devotional activities (such as weddings, purchase of property etc.) are prohibited during this month so that attention can be given exclusively to the worship of God without any diversions. In South India, especially the Vaikunta Ekadasi, which falls during Dhanur Mas, attracts thousands of devotees. Temples conduct special pujas during this period.

Sri Krishna in Bhagavad Gita, says मासानां मार्गशीर्षोहम् 10.35. I manifest more in Margashirsha Maas among the different months in a year.

According to tradition, the Gods wake up early in the morning during the month of Dhanurmas. They perform special prayers to Sri Maha Vishnu during the auspicious period of "Brahm Muhurta", which is one and a half hours before sunrise. During this month, devotees offer prayers to the Lord very early in the morning. The month of Dhanurmas is considered a very special month for performing Puja of Vishnu.

Dhanurmas Phal Shruti: Worshiping Vishnu on a single day during this auspicious period is equal to worshiping Vishnu with devotion for 1000 years. Every single step taken towards the nearby lake, river etc. for morning dip during this month brings forth merit equal to performing an Ashvamedha Yaga.

During this period the sun is in the Sagittarius or "धनु राशि", the period when the sun passes from Sagittarius to Capricorn or "मकर राशि" is considered as a period of scarcity to the plenty in India. Feeding or giving alms to the deserving poor and Brahmins during this period is believed to confer great merit i.e. Punya.

== Other uses ==
Dhanus is also the second month in the Darian calendar for the planet Mars, when the Sun traverses the eastern sector of the constellation Sagittarius as seen from Mars.
