= Vṛṣabha =

Month in Indian lunisolar calendars

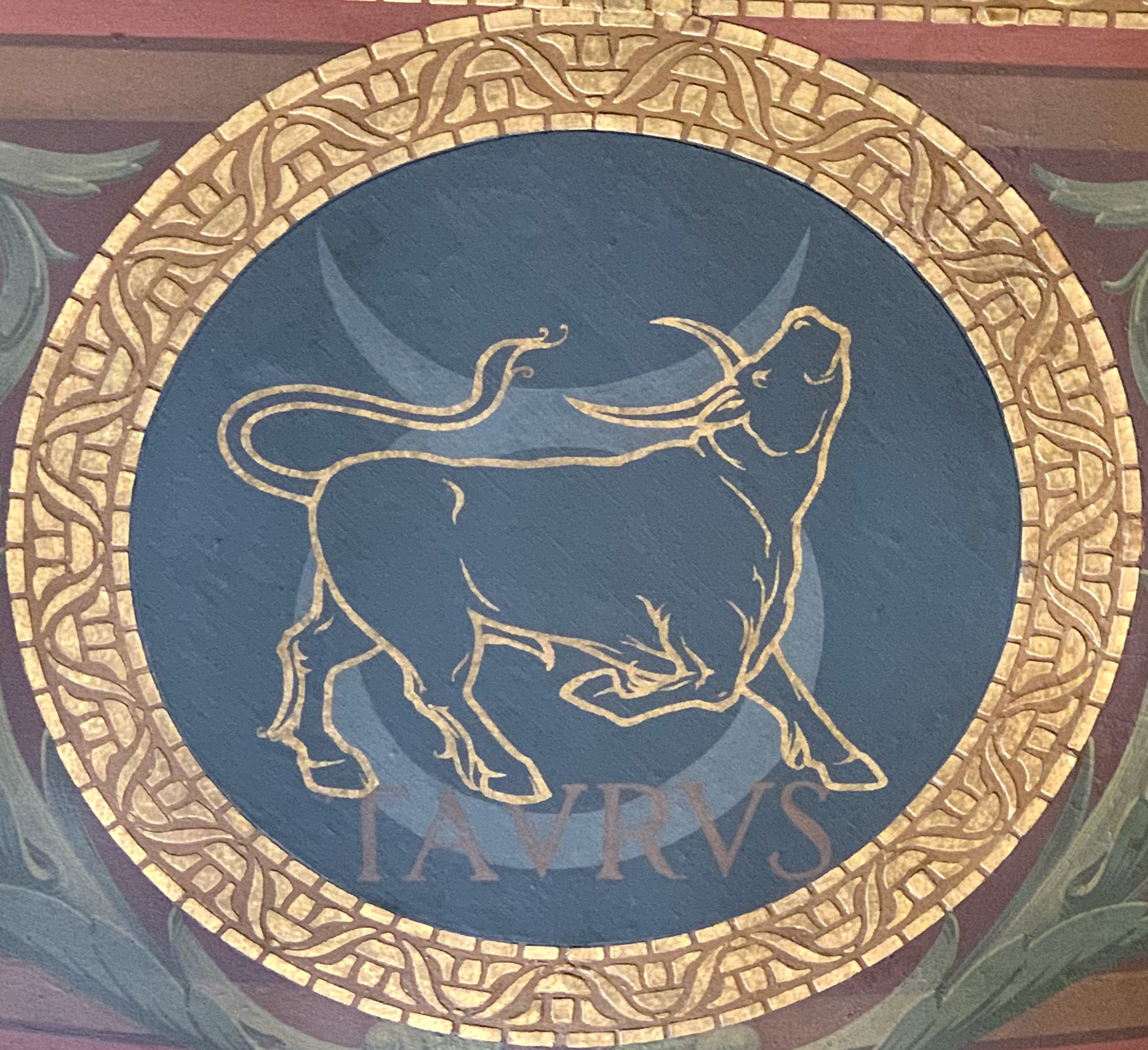
Taurus Astrological Sign at the Wisconsin State Capitol

Vṛṣabha, Vrishabha or Vṛṣa, is the second month in the Indian solar calendar. It corresponds to the zodiacal sign of Taurus, and overlaps with about the second half of May and about the first half of June in the Gregorian calendar. The first day of the month is called Vrishbha Sankranti, and it generally falls on May 14 or 15.

In Vedic texts, the month of Vṛṣabha is called Madhava (IAST: Mādhava), but in these ancient texts it has no zodiacal associations. The solar month of Vṛṣabha overlaps with the lunar month of Jyeshtha in Hindu lunisolar calendars. Vṛṣabha is preceded by the solar month of Mesha and followed by the solar month of Mithuna.

The month of Vṛṣabha is called Vaikasi in the Tamil Hindu calendar. The ancient and medieval era Sanskrit texts of India vary in their calculations about the duration of Vrsabha, just like they do with other months. For example, the Surya Siddhanta calculates the duration of Vrsabha to be 31 days, 10 hours, 5 minutes and 12 seconds. In contrast, the Arya Siddhanta calculates the duration of Vrsabha to be 31 days, 9 hours, 37 minutes and 36 seconds.

The Indian solar month names are significant in epigraphical studies of South Asia. The month, along with other solar months, are found inscribed in medieval era Hindu temples.

Vṛṣabha is also an astrological sign in Indian horoscope systems, corresponding to Taurus.

Vṛṣabha is also the twelfth month in the Darian calendar for the planet Mars, when the Sun traverses the central sector of the constellation Taurus as seen from Mars.
