= Darian calendar =

System of time-keeping for future human settlers on Mars

The Darian calendar is a proposed system of timekeeping designed to serve the needs of any possible future human settlers on the planet Mars. It was created by aerospace engineer, political scientist, and space jurist Thomas Gangale in 1985 and named by him after his son Darius. It was first published in June 1986. In 1998 at the founding convention of the Mars Society the calendar was presented as one of two calendar options to be considered along with eighteen other factors to consider for the colonization of Mars.

Due to the use of 28 sol months, the Darian calendar has no mechanism for synchronization with Earth dates or its synodic periods. It is specifically engineered for Martian cycles, whereas the Gregorian calendar is built for Earth's orbital period and day length. For future settlers, the two systems serve different roles: one provides local seasonal accuracy on Mars, while the other maintains a connection to Earth's legal and social standards.

== Year length and intercalation ==
The basic time periods from which the calendar is constructed are the Martian solar day (sometimes called a sol) and the Martian vernal equinox year. The sol is 39 minutes 35.244 seconds longer than the Terrestrial solar day, and the Martian vernal equinox year is 668.5907 sols in length (which corresponds to 686.9711 days on Earth).

The basic intercalation formula therefore allocates six 669-sol years and four 668-sol years to each Martian decade. The former are still called leap years, even though they are more common than non-leap years, and are years that are either odd (not evenly divisible by 2) or are evenly divisible by 10: this produces 6,686 sols per ten years, giving an average year of 668.6 sols.

A 1998 iteration of the Darian calendar had leap years cancelled if the year was divisible by 100, unless the year was also divisible by 500; adding these rules produces an average year of 668.592 sols, a more reasonable approximation.

However, these static intercalation schemes did not take into account the slowly increasing length of the Martian vernal equinox year. Thus, in 2006, Gangale devised a series of intercalation formulas, all of which have in common the basic decennial cycle, as shown in the following table:

Range of years	Formula	Mean length of calendar year
0–2000	(Y − 1)\2 + Y\10 − Y\100 + Y\1000	668.5910 sols
2001–4800	(Y − 1)\2 + Y\10 − Y\150	668.5933 sols
4801–6800	(Y − 1)\2 + Y\10 − Y\200	668.5950 sols
6801–8400	(Y − 1)\2 + Y\10 − Y\300	668.5967 sols
8401–10000	(Y − 1)\2 + Y\10 − Y\600	668.5983 sols

This extended intercalation scheme gives an average year of 668.59453 days over a 10,000-year period: this results in an error of only about one sol at the end of 12,000 Martian years, or the year 24,180 of the Common Era.

== Calendar layout ==
The year is divided into 24 months. The first 5 months in each quarter have 28 sols, while the final month has 27 sols unless it is the final month of a leap year, when it contains the leap sol as its final sol.

The calendar maintains a seven-sol week, but the week is restarted from its first sol at the start of each month. If a month has 27 sols, this causes the final sol of the week to be omitted.

This is partly for tidiness and can also be rationalised as making the average length of the Martian week close to the average length of the Terrestrial week; 28 Earth days is very close to 27 1/4 Martian sols, whereas a month is an average length of 27 5/6 Martian sols.

In the table, the sols of the week are Sol Solis, Sol Lunae, Sol Martis, Sol Mercurii, Sol Jovis, Sol Veneris, Sol Saturni.

Sagittarius							Dhanus							Capricornus
So	Lu	Ma	Me	Jo	Ve	Sa	So	Lu	Ma	Me	Jo	Ve	Sa	So	Lu	Ma	Me	Jo	Ve	Sa
1	2	3	4	5	6	7	1	2	3	4	5	6	7	1	2	3	4	5	6	7
8	9	10	11	12	13	14	8	9	10	11	12	13	14	8	9	10	11	12	13	14
15	16	17	18	19	20	21	15	16	17	18	19	20	21	15	16	17	18	19	20	21
22	23	24	25	26	27	28	22	23	24	25	26	27	28	22	23	24	25	26	27	28
Makara							Aquarius							Kumbha
So	Lu	Ma	Me	Jo	Ve	Sa	So	Lu	Ma	Me	Jo	Ve	Sa	So	Lu	Ma	Me	Jo	Ve	Sa
1	2	3	4	5	6	7	1	2	3	4	5	6	7	1	2	3	4	5	6	7
8	9	10	11	12	13	14	8	9	10	11	12	13	14	8	9	10	11	12	13	14
15	16	17	18	19	20	21	15	16	17	18	19	20	21	15	16	17	18	19	20	21
22	23	24	25	26	27	28	22	23	24	25	26	27	28	22	23	24	25	26	27
Pisces							Mina							Aries
So	Lu	Ma	Me	Jo	Ve	Sa	So	Lu	Ma	Me	Jo	Ve	Sa	So	Lu	Ma	Me	Jo	Ve	Sa
1	2	3	4	5	6	7	1	2	3	4	5	6	7	1	2	3	4	5	6	7
8	9	10	11	12	13	14	8	9	10	11	12	13	14	8	9	10	11	12	13	14
15	16	17	18	19	20	21	15	16	17	18	19	20	21	15	16	17	18	19	20	21
22	23	24	25	26	27	28	22	23	24	25	26	27	28	22	23	24	25	26	27	28
Mesha							Taurus							Rishabha
So	Lu	Ma	Me	Jo	Ve	Sa	So	Lu	Ma	Me	Jo	Ve	Sa	So	Lu	Ma	Me	Jo	Ve	Sa
1	2	3	4	5	6	7	1	2	3	4	5	6	7	1	2	3	4	5	6	7
8	9	10	11	12	13	14	8	9	10	11	12	13	14	8	9	10	11	12	13	14
15	16	17	18	19	20	21	15	16	17	18	19	20	21	15	16	17	18	19	20	21
22	23	24	25	26	27	28	22	23	24	25	26	27	28	22	23	24	25	26	27
Gemini							Mithuna							Cancer
So	Lu	Ma	Me	Jo	Ve	Sa	So	Lu	Ma	Me	Jo	Ve	Sa	So	Lu	Ma	Me	Jo	Ve	Sa
1	2	3	4	5	6	7	1	2	3	4	5	6	7	1	2	3	4	5	6	7
8	9	10	11	12	13	14	8	9	10	11	12	13	14	8	9	10	11	12	13	14
15	16	17	18	19	20	21	15	16	17	18	19	20	21	15	16	17	18	19	20	21
22	23	24	25	26	27	28	22	23	24	25	26	27	28	22	23	24	25	26	27	28
Karka							Leo							Simha
So	Lu	Ma	Me	Jo	Ve	Sa	So	Lu	Ma	Me	Jo	Ve	Sa	So	Lu	Ma	Me	Jo	Ve	Sa
1	2	3	4	5	6	7	1	2	3	4	5	6	7	1	2	3	4	5	6	7
8	9	10	11	12	13	14	8	9	10	11	12	13	14	8	9	10	11	12	13	14
15	16	17	18	19	20	21	15	16	17	18	19	20	21	15	16	17	18	19	20	21
22	23	24	25	26	27	28	22	23	24	25	26	27	28	22	23	24	25	26	27
Virgo							Kanya							Libra
So	Lu	Ma	Me	Jo	Ve	Sa	So	Lu	Ma	Me	Jo	Ve	Sa	So	Lu	Ma	Me	Jo	Ve	Sa
1	2	3	4	5	6	7	1	2	3	4	5	6	7	1	2	3	4	5	6	7
8	9	10	11	12	13	14	8	9	10	11	12	13	14	8	9	10	11	12	13	14
15	16	17	18	19	20	21	15	16	17	18	19	20	21	15	16	17	18	19	20	21
22	23	24	25	26	27	28	22	23	24	25	26	27	28	22	23	24	25	26	27	28
Tula							Scorpius							Vrishika
So	Lu	Ma	Me	Jo	Ve	Sa	So	Lu	Ma	Me	Jo	Ve	Sa	So	Lu	Ma	Me	Jo	Ve	Sa
1	2	3	4	5	6	7	1	2	3	4	5	6	7	1	2	3	4	5	6	7
8	9	10	11	12	13	14	8	9	10	11	12	13	14	8	9	10	11	12	13	14
15	16	17	18	19	20	21	15	16	17	18	19	20	21	15	16	17	18	19	20	21
22	23	24	25	26	27	28	22	23	24	25	26	27	28	22	23	24	25	26	27	28

The last sol of Vrishika is an intercalary sol that only occurs on leap years, like February 29 in the Gregorian calendar.

== Start of year ==
The Martian year is treated as beginning near the equinox marking spring in the northern hemisphere of the planet. Mars currently has an axial inclination similar to that of the Earth, so the Martian seasons are perceptible, though the greater eccentricity of Mars's orbit about the Sun compared with that of the Earth means that their significance is strongly amplified in the southern hemisphere and masked in the northern hemisphere.

== Epoch ==
Gangale originally chose late 1975 as the epoch of the calendar in recognition of the American Viking program as the first fully successful (American) soft landing mission to Mars (the earlier 1971 Soviet Mars 3 Landing having delivered only 15 seconds of data from the planet's surface). In 2002 he adopted the Telescopic Epoch, first suggested by Peter Kokh in 1999 and adopted by Shaun Moss in 2001 for his Utopian Calendar, which is in 1609 in recognition of Johannes Kepler's use of Tycho Brahe's observations of Mars to elucidate the laws of planetary motion, and also Galileo Galilei's first observations of Mars with a telescope. Selection of the Telescopic Epoch thus unified the structures of the Darian and Utopian calendars, their remaining differences being nomenclatural. It also avoids the problem of the many telescopic observations of Mars over the past 400 years being relegated to negative dates.

== Nomenclature ==
The Darian calendar has been widely imitated. Suggested variations abound on the internet that use different nomenclature schemata for the days of the week and the months of the year. In the original Darian calendar, the names of the 24 months were provisionally chosen by Gangale as the Latin names of constellations of the zodiac and their Sanskrit equivalents in alternation. The 7 sols of the week, similarly, were provisionally named after the Sun, the largest Martian moon Phobos (Sol Phobotis) and the 5 brightest planets as seen from Mars including Earth (Sol Terrae). These were later modified to follow the familiar convention of the Romance languages, replacing Sol Phobotis with Sol Lunae and Sol Terrae with Sol Martis. The Darian Defrost Calendar, however, uses the Rotterdam System to create new names for the Martian months out of patterns relating letter choice and name length to month order and season. The Utopian Calendar, devised by the Mars Time Group in 2001, also has additional suggestions for nomenclature modification. In 2025, Gangale adapted the Chinese solar terms as alternative names of the months to accommodate East Asian cultures, observing, "they invoke events which may occur with the passing of the seasons on Mars someday if terraforming is successful; thus, the Darian Chinese system is both aspirational and inspiring."

Comparison of month names by system
N°	Darian	Rotterdam	Utopian	Chinese
1	Sagittarius	Adir	Phoenix	火星春分 (Spring Equinox)
2	Dhanus	Bora	Cetus	火星清明 (Pure Brightness)
3	Capricornus	Coan	Dorado	火星穀雨 (Grain Rain)
4	Makara	Deti	Lepus	火星立夏 (Beginning of Summer)
5	Aquarius	Edal	Columba	火星小滿 (Grain Buds)
6	Kumba	Flo	Monoceros	火星芒種 (Grain in Ear)
7	Pisces	Geor	Volans	火星夏至 (Summer Solstice)
8	Mina	Heliba	Lynx	火星小暑 (Minor Heat)
9	Aries	Idanon	Camelopardalis	火星大暑 (Major Heat)
10	Mesha	Jowani	Chamaeleon	火星立秋 (Beginning of Autumn)
11	Taurus	Kireal	Hydra	火星處暑 (End of Heat)
12	Rishabha	Larno	Corvus	火星白露 (White Dew)
13	Gemini	Medior	Centaurus	火星秋分 (Autumn Equinox)
14	Mithuna	Neturima	Draco	火星寒露 (Cold Dew)
15	Cancer	Ozulikan	Lupus	火星霜降 (Frost's Descent)
16	Karka	Pasurabi	Apus	火星立冬 (Beginning of Winter)
17	Leo	Rudiakel	Pavo	火星小雪 (Minor Snow)
18	Simha	Safundo	Aquila	火星大雪 (Major Snow)
19	Virgo	Tiunor	Vulpecula	火星冬至 (Winter Solstice)
20	Kanya	Ulasja	Cygnus	火星小寒 (Minor Cold)
21	Libra	Vadeun	Delphinus	火星大寒 (Major Cold)
22	Tula	Wakumi	Grus	火星立春 (Beginning of Spring)
23	Scorpius	Xetual	Pegasus	火星雨水 (Rain Water)
24	Vrishika	Zungo	Tucana	火星驚蟄 (Awakening of Insects)

== Mars Julian sol ==
The Mars Julian sol count is analogous to the Julian Day count on Earth, in that it is a continuous numerical counting of days from an epoch. The Mars Julian sol epoch is the same as for the Darian calendar, thus Mars Julian sol 0 is 1 Sagittarius 0.

== Comparison with timekeeping systems in planetary science ==
Since the Darian calendar is designed as a civil calendar for human communities on Mars, it has no precise analog in the scientific community, which has no need to mark Martian time in terms of weeks or months. Two unrelated epochs that have gained some traction in the scientific community are the Mars sol date and the Mars year. In 1998 Michael Allison proposed the Mars sol date epoch of 29 December 1873 (Julian Day 2405521.502). In 2000 R. T. Clancy et al. proposed the Mars year 1 set to the epoch 11 April 1955 (Julian Day 2435208.456). The Clancy Mars year is reckoned from one Martian northward equinox to the next (L_{s} = 0°), and specific dates within a given year are expressed in L_{s}. The Clancy Mars year count is approximately equal to the Darian year count minus 183. The Allison Mars sol date epoch equates to L_{s} = 276.6° in a year that is undefined in the Clancy Mars year count. It converts to 25 Virgo 140 on the Darian calendar and Mars Julian sol 94128.511.

== Martiana calendar ==
In 2002 Gangale devised a variant of the Darian calendar that reconciles the months and the sols of the week in a repeating pattern and removes the need to omit days of the week. In the Martiana variant, all the months in a given quarter begin on the same sol of the week, but the sol that begins each month shifts from one quarter to the next, based on the scheme devised by the astronomer Robert G. Aitken in 1936.

The following table shows the sol of the week on which each month in the quarter begins. The first quarter corresponds to spring in the Martian northern hemisphere and autumn in the Martian southern hemisphere.

	First quarter	Second quarter	Third quarter	Last quarter
Even-numbered years	Sol Solis	Sol Saturni	Sol Veneris	Sol Jovis
Odd-numbered years	Sol Mercurii	Sol Martis	Sol Lunae	Sol Solis

The leap sol occurs at the end of odd-numbered years as in the original Darian calendar. Since the last month of odd-numbered years contains 28 sols, the following year also begins on Sol Solis, resulting in a two-year cycle over which the relationship of the sols of the week to the months repeats. The sol that is added every tenth year is epagomenal (not counted as part of the week), thus the two-year rotation of the sols of the week is not disrupted. The Martiana scheme avoids the Darian calendar's need to shorten the week to six sols three to four times per year. The disadvantage is that the scheme results in a two-year cycle for reconciling the sols of the week and the months, whereas the Darian calendar is repeatable from month to month.

== Other Darian calendars ==
In 1998 Gangale adapted the Darian calendar for use on the four Galilean moons of Jupiter discovered by Galileo in 1610: Io, Europa, Ganymede, and Callisto. In 2003 he created a variant of the calendar for Titan.

== Important dates in Martian history ==
Event	Earth timekeeping (UTC SCET)		Mars timekeeping (Airy Mean Time)			
Event	Gregorian date	Time	Darian date	Mars Julian Sol	Mars Sol Date	Time
Mariner 4 flyby	15 July 1965	1:00:57	26 Taurus 189	126668	32539	23:25
Mariner 6 flyby	31 July 1969	5:19:07	15 Cancer 191	128106	33977	15:10
Mariner 7 flyby	5 August 1969	5:00:49	20 Cancer 191	128111	33982	11:29
Mariner 9 entered orbit	13 November 1971	18:00	20 Kanya 192	128919	34790	19:19
Mars 2 entered orbit	27 November 1971		6 Libra 192*	128933*	34804*	
Mars 3 contact lost 15 seconds after landing	2 December 1971	13:52	11 Libra 192	128938	34809	3:06
Mars 2 contact lost	22 August 1972		16 Kumbha 193*	129194*	35065*	
Mariner 9 contact lost	27 October 1972		26 Mina 193*	129259*	35130*	
Mars 4 failed to enter orbit	10 February 1974		10 Sagittarius 194*	129717*	35588*	
Mars 5 entered orbit	12 February 1974	15:45	12 Sagittarius 194	129719	35590	17:18
Mars 5 contact lost	7 March 1974		6 Dhanus 194*	129741*	35612*	
Mars 7 lander missed Mars	9 March 1974		8 Dhanus 194*	129743*	35614*	
Mars 6 landing, contact lost after 224 seconds	12 March 1974	9:11:05	11 Dhanus 194	129746	35617	16:56
Viking 1 entered orbit	19 June 1976		12 Pisces 195*	130554*	36425*	
Viking 1 landing	20 July 1976	11:53	14 Mina 195	130584	36455	18:40
Viking 2 entered orbit	7 August 1976		4 Aries 195*	130602*	36473*	
Viking 2 landing	3 September 1976	22:58	3 Mesha 195	130629	36500	0:34
Viking 2 Orbiter contact lost	25 July 1978		5 Mesha 196*	131300*	37171*	
Viking 2 Lander contact lost	11 April 1980		2 Mina 197*	131909*	37780*	
Viking 1 Orbiter contact lost	17 August 1980		14 Rishabha 197*	132033*	37904*	
Viking 1 Lander contact lost	11 November 1982		1 Leo 198*	132828*	38699*	
Phobos 2 entered orbit	29 January 1989		11 Vrishika 201*	135038*	40909*	
Phobos 2 contact lost	27 March 1989		10 Dhanus 202*	135093*	40964*	
Mars Pathfinder landing	4 July 1997	16:57	26 Taurus 206	138034	43905	4:41
Mars Pathfinder rover Sojourner contact lost	27 September 1997	10:23	25 Mithuna 206	138116	43987	15:43
Mars Global Surveyor entered orbit	11 September 1997	1:17:00	9 Mithuna 206	138100	43971	17:08
Mars Climate Orbiter destroyed entering atmosphere	23 September 1999	9:05	8 Karka 207	138823	44694	4:16
Mars Polar Lander impact	3 December 1999	20:15	21 Simha 207	138892	44763	17:32
2001 Mars Odyssey entered orbit	24 October 2001	2:18:00	24 Simha 208	139564	45435	12:21
Nozomi failed to enter orbit	14 December 2003		6 Tula 209*	140325*	46196*	
Mars Express entered orbit	25 December 2003	3:00	16 Tula 209	140335	46206	8:27
Beagle 2 lander impact	25 December 2003	3:54:00	16 Tula 209	140335	46206	9:20
MER-A Spirit landing	4 January 2004	4:35	26 Tula 209	140345	46216	3:35
MER-B Opportunity landing	25 January 2004	5:05	18 Scorpius 209	140365	46236	14:35
Mars Reconnaissance Orbiter entered orbit	10 March 2006	21:24	20 Dhanus 211	141120	46991	12:48
Phoenix landing	25 May 2008	23:54	25 Kumbha 212	141906	47777	1:02
Phoenix contact lost	28 October 2008		9 Rishabha 212*	142057*	47928*	
MER-A Spirit contact lost	22 March 2010		4 Kumbha 213*	142553*	48424*	
MSL Curiosity landing	6 August 2012	5:17	13 Rishabha 214	143398	49269	5:50
MAVEN entered orbit	22 September 2014	02:24	18 Cancer 215	144154	50025	8:07
Mars Orbiter Mission entered orbit	24 September 2014	02:00	20 Cancer 215	144156	50027	6:27
ExoMars Trace Gas Orbiter entered orbit, Schiaparelli EDM lander impact	19 October 2016	15:24	3 Simha 216	144892	51348	14:02
MER-B Opportunity ceased communication	12 June 2018		4 Cancer 217*	145477*	51348*	
InSight landing, Mars Cube One flyby	26 November 2018	19:52:59	26 Kanya 217	145640	51511	05:14:37
Perseverance landing	18 February 2021	20:55 UTC	13 Sagittarius 219	146433	52304	10:54

*Mars dates are approximate where the exact (Earth) time of the event is not stated.

== The Darian calendar in fiction ==
Gangale was inspired to create the calendar after reading Red Planet, a 1949 science fiction book by Robert A. Heinlein. In the book, Heinlein postulates a 24-month Martian calendar.

The Darian calendar is mentioned in several works of fiction set on Mars:

- Star Trek: Department of Temporal Investigations: Watching the Clock by Christopher L. Bennett, Pocket Books/Star Trek (April 26, 2011)
- The Quantum Thief by Hannu Rajaniemi, Tor Books; Reprint edition (May 10, 2011)
- Thin Air by Richard K. Morgan, Del Rey Books, October 2018.
- Black Helicopters by Caitlín R. Kiernan, Tor Books, 2018

== See also ==
- Astronomy on Mars
- Timekeeping on Mars
