= Tamil calendar =

Sidereal Hindu calendar used by the Tamil people

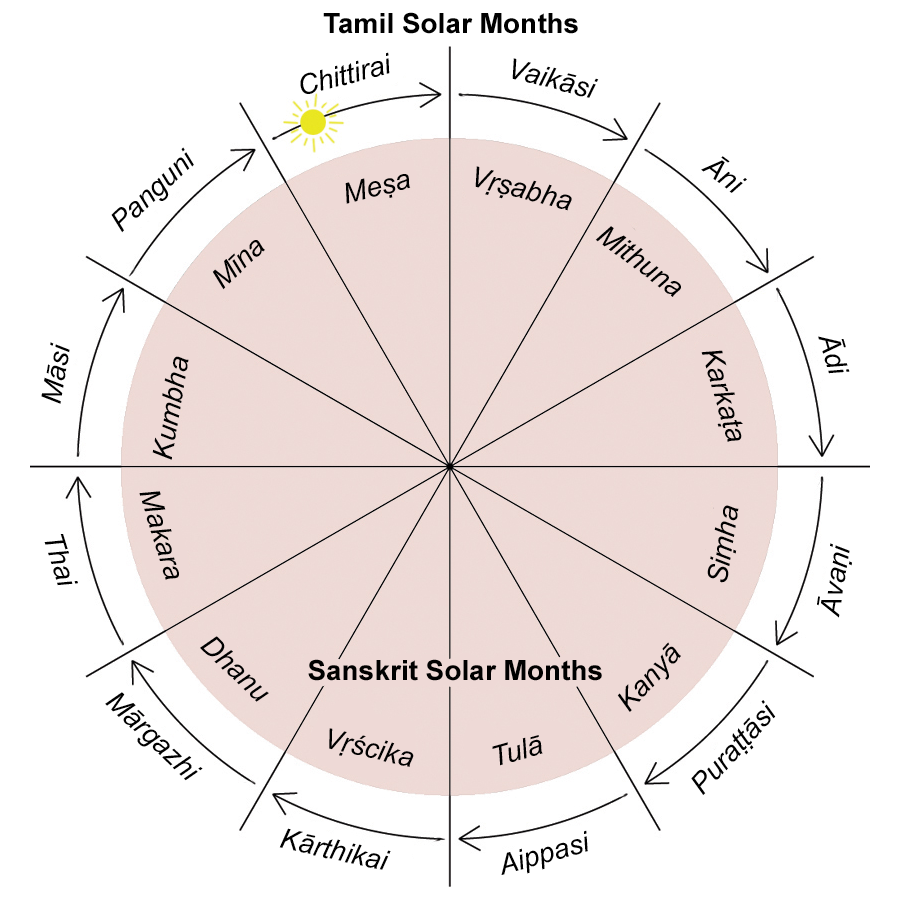
Months of the Tamil calendar

The Tamil calendar is a sidereal solar calendar used by the Tamil people. It is used in the Indian subcontinent, and other countries with significant Tamil population like Sri Lanka, Malaysia, Singapore, Myanmar and Mauritius. It is used in contemporary times for cultural, religious and agricultural events, with the Gregorian calendar largely used for official purposes.

== History ==
There are several references to the calendar in early Tamil literature. Nakkeerar, the Sangam period author of the Neṭunalvāṭai, wrote in the third century CE that the Sun travels each year from Mesha/Chittirai in mid-April through 11 successive signs of the zodiac. The same is referenced to by Kūdalūr Kiḻar in Puṟanāṉūṟu. Tolkappiyam, the oldest surviving Tamil grammar text, divides the year into six seasons and Chittirai marks the start of the "ilavenil" (summer) season. The fifth century CE treatise of Cilappatikaram mentions the 12 rāśis (zodiac signs) that correspond to the Tamil months. The sixth century epic Manimekalai alludes to this to the Hindu solar calendar.

Inscriptional evidences from Pagan in Myanmar from the 11th century CE and in Sukhothai in Thailand from the 14th century CE point to South Indian courtiers being tasked with defining the traditional calendar that followed a similar cycle.

== Description ==
The Tamil calendar is based on the Hindu system of calendrics that was used to calculate date and time. The Tirukkanida Panchanga derived from astronomical data is used as a basis for the same. The calendar is similar to traditional calendars followed in other parts of the Indian subcontinent, and Southeast Asia.

The Tamil calendar follows a 60-year cycle similar to the other traditional calendars of India. The Tamil New Year follows the Nirayana system, and usually falls on 13 or 14 April in the Gregorian year. The new year starts on the date arrived by adding the days corresponding to the 23 degrees of trepidation (oscillation) to the vernal equinox, when the Sun begins its transition as per the Hindu sidereal calendar. A Tamil calendar year might consist of 365 or 366 days in a year.

== Sixty-year cycle ==
The 60-year cycle is common to Hindu traditional calendars, with similar names and sequence of years. The earliest reference of the same is in Surya Siddhanta, dated between 4th and 9th century CE. There are parallels to the sexagenary cycle used in the Chinese calendar, though which influenced the other has been subject to debate.

After the completion of a cycle of sixty years, the calendar re-starts with the first year of a new cycle. As per the Hindu Panchangam, it represents the year in which Shani Saturn (which takes 30 years to complete one cycle round the Sun) and Vyalan (Jupiter) (which takes 12 years to complete one cycle round the Sun) come to a same position after 60 years.

The following list presents the current 60-year cycle of the Tamil calendar:

No.	Name	Transliteration	Gregorian Year	No.	Name	Transliteration	Gregorian Year
01.	பிரபவ	Prabhāva	1987–1988	31.	ஹேவிளம்பி	Hēvilaṃbi	2017–2018
02.	விபவ	Vibhāva	1988–1989	32.	விளம்பி	Vilaṃbi	2018–2019
03.	சுக்ல	Śuklā	1989–1990	33.	விகாரி	Vikāri	2019–2020
04.	பிரமோதூத	Pramadutā	1990–1991	34.	சார்வரி	Śarvarī	2020–2021
05.	பிரசோற்பத்தி	Prachopati	1991–1992	35.	பிலவ	Plava	2021–2022
06.	ஆங்கீரச	Āṅgirasa	1992–1993	36.	சுபகிருது	Śubhakṛt	2022–2023
07.	ஸ்ரீமுக	Śrīmukha	1993–1994	37.	சோபக்ருத்	Śobhakṛt	2023–2024
08.	பவ	Bhava	1994–1995	38.	க்ரோதி	Krodhī	2024–2025
09.	யுவ	Yuva	1995–1996	39.	விசுவாசுவ	Viśvāvasuva	2025–2026
10.	தாது	Dhātu	1996–1997	40.	பராபவ	Paraapava	2026–2027
11.	ஈஸ்வர	Īśvara	1997–1998	41.	ப்லவங்க	Plavaṅga	2027–2028
12.	வெகுதானிய	Vehudānya	1998–1999	42.	கீலக	Kīlaka	2028–2029
13.	பிரமாதி	Pramāti	1999–2000	43.	சௌம்ய	Saumya	2029–2030
14.	விக்ரம	Vikrama	2000–2001	44.	சாதாரண	Sādhāraṇa	2030–2031
15.	விஷு	Viṣu	2001–2002	45.	விரோதகிருது	Virodhikṛti	2031–2032
16.	சித்திரபானு	Citrabhānu	2002–2003	46.	பரிதாபி	Paritapi	2032–2033
17.	சுபானு	Subhānu	2003–2004	47.	பிரமாதீச	Pramādīca	2033–2034
18.	தாரண	Dhārana	2004–2005	48.	ஆனந்த	Ānanda	2034–2035
19.	பார்த்திப	Partibhā	2005–2006	49.	ராட்சச	Rākṣasaḥ	2035–2036
20.	விய	Viya	2006–2007	50.	நள	Nala	2036–2037
21.	சர்வஜித்	Sarvajit	2007–2008	51.	பிங்கள	Piṅgāla	2037–2038
22.	சர்வதாரி	Sarvadhārī	2008–2009	52.	காளயுக்தி	Kālayukti	2038–2039
23.	விரோதி	Virodhī	2009–2010	53.	சித்தார்த்தி	Siddhidātrī	2039–2040
24.	விக்ருதி	Vikṛti	2010–2011	54.	ரௌத்திரி	Rautrī	2040–2041
25.	கர	Kara	2011–2012	55.	துன்மதி	Dhūnmatī	2041–2042
26.	நந்தன	Nandhana	2012–2013	56.	துந்துபி	Dundubhi	2042–2043
27.	விஜய	Vijaya	2013–2014	57.	ருத்ரோத்காரி	Rudhirōtgāri	2043–2044
28.	ஜய	Jaya	2014–2015	58.	ரக்தாட்சி	Rākṣasī	2044–2045
29.	மன்மத	Manmatha	2015–2016	59.	க்ரோதன	Krodhanā	2045–2046
30.	துன்முகி	Dhuṇmūkī	2016–2017	60.	அட்சய	Akṣayā	2046–2047

== Months ==
There are twelve months in the Tamil calendar, with 29 to 32 days per month. Tamil months start and end based on the Sun's shift from one rasi to the other, and the names of the months are based on the nakshatra (star) that coincides with the start of the pournami (full moon) in that month. The Tamil calendar month starts a few days after the corresponding Hindu calendar month as the Tamil calendar is a solar calendar, while the other is a lunisolar calendar.

Month (in Tamil)	Transliteration	Hindu Lunar calendar	Nakshatra	Gregorian calendar	Days
சித்திரை	Chittirai	Chaitra	Chittirai	April–May	30–31
வைகாசி	Vaikāsi	Vaisakha	Visakam	May–June	31–32
ஆனி	Āni	Jyestha	Anusham	June–July	31–32
ஆடி	Ādi	Asadha	Pooradam or Uthiradam	July–August	31–32
ஆவணி	Āvaṇi	Shravana	Thiruvonam	August–September	31–32
புரட்டாசி	Puraṭṭāsi	Bhadrapada	Pooratathi or Uthiratathi	September–October	30–31
ஐப்பசி	Aippasi	Asvina	Ashvini	October–November	29–30
கார்த்திகை	Kārtikai	Kartika	Kartikai	November–December	29–30
மார்கழி	Mārgaḻi	Margashirsha	Mirgashirsham	December–January	29–30
தை	Tai	Pausha	Pusham	January–February	29–30
மாசி	Māsi	Magha	Magham	February–March	29–30
பங்குனி	Panguni	Phalguna	Uttiram	March–April	30–31

== Seasons ==
A Tamil year is divided into six seasons, each of which lasts two months.

Season (in Tamil)	Transliteration	English translation	Hindu calendar	Common season	Tamil month(s)	Gregorian month(s)
இளவேனில்	Ila-venil	Light warmth	Vasanta	Spring	Chittirai, Vaikāsi	April–June
முதுவேனில்	Mudhu-venil	Harsh warmth	Grishma	Summer	Āni, Ādi	June–August
கார்	Kār	Dark clouds	Varsha	Monsoon	Āvaṇi, Puraṭṭāsi	August–October
குளிர்	Kulir	Cold	Sharda	Autumn	Aippasi, Kārtikai	October–December
முன்பனி	Mun-pani	Early mist	Hemanta	Winter	Mārgaḻi, Thai	December–February
பின்பனி	Pin-pani	Late mist	Shishira	Pre-vernal	Māsi, Panguni	February–April

== Days of a week ==
The days of week (Kiḻamai) in the Tamil calendar relate to the celestial bodies in the Solar System: Sun, Moon, Mars, Mercury, Jupiter, Venus, and Saturn, in that order. A week usually starts with Sunday, and ends in a Saturday.

Day (in Tamil)	English transliteration	Shaka Calendar	Deity	Celestial body	Gregorian Calendar
ஞாயிற்றுக்கிழமை	Nyayitru-kiḻamai	Ravivāra	Surya	Sun	Sunday
திங்கட்கிழமை	Tingat-kiḻamai	Somavāra	Chandra	Moon	Monday
செவ்வாய்க்கிழமை	Chevvai-kiḻamai	Mangalavāra	Mangala	Mars	Tuesday
புதன்கிழமை	Budhan-kiḻamai	Budhavāra	Budha	Mercury	Wednesday
வியாழக்கிழமை	Vyaḻa-kiḻamai	Guruvāra	Brihaspati	Jupiter	Thursday
வெள்ளிக்கிழமை	Velli-kiḻamai	Śukravāra	Shukra	Venus	Friday
சனிக்கிழமை	Sani-kiḻamai	Śanivāra	Shani	Saturn	Saturday

== Significance ==
The various days and months of the Tamil Calendar are of specific significance to Tamil Hindus. The Vakiya Panchangam is employed for calculation of sacred days, while the Tirugaṇita Panchangam is employed for astrological calculations.

The months and their significant events and festivals are listed below.

Month	Events/festivals
Chittirai	Chitra Pournami, Meenakshi Tirukalyanam, Puthandu
Vaikāsi	Vaikasi Visakam
Aani	Aani Thirumanjanam, Mangani
Āadi	Chevvai (Tuesdays) and Velli (Fridays) dedicated to Mariamman; Aadi Amavasai, Aadi Perukku, Pooram
Āvaṇi	Avani Avittam, Gokulashtami, Vinayakar Chaturti
Puratāsi	Shani (Saturdays) dedicated to Vishnu; Navarathri
Aippasi	Deepavali
Kārtikai	Thingal (Mondays) dedicated to Shiva; Karthigai Deepam, Karthigai Pournami
Margaḻi	Hanuman Jayanti, Thiruvathirai, Vaikuntha Ekadasi
Thai	Pongal, Thaipusam
Māsi	Maha Shivaratri, Masi Maham, Poochoriyal
Panguni	Panguni Uthiram, Rama Navami

== See also ==
- Chandravakyas
- Malayalam calendar
- Pambu Panchangam
