= Aani (month) =

- Native name: Āni
- Calendar: Tamil calendar
- Month number: 3
- Number of days: 31 or 32
- Season: Mudhu-venil (summer)
- Gregorian equivalent: June–July
- Significant days: Aani Thirumanjanam; Mangani

Aani is the third month of the Tamil calendar. The name of the month is derived from the position of the Moon near the Anusham nakshatra (star) on the pournami (full moon) day. The month corresponds to muthu-venil (summer) season and falls in June–July in the Gregorian calendar.

In the Hindu lunar calendar, it corresponds to the third month of Jyeshtha, falling in the Gregorian months of May–June.

In the Hindu solar calendar, it corresponds to the third month of Mithuna and begins with the Sun's entry into Gemini.

In the Vaishnav calendar, it corresponds to the third month of Trivikrama.

== See also ==
- Astronomical basis of the Hindu calendar
- Hindu astronomy
