= Margazhi =

- Calendar: Tamil calendar
- Month number: 9
- Number of days: 29 or 30
- Season: Mun-pani (winter)
- Gregorian equivalent: December–January
- Significant days: Hanuman Jayanti; Thiruvathirai; Vaikuntha Ekadashi

Margazhi or Margali is the ninth month of the Tamil calendar. The name of the month is derived from the position of the Moon near the Mirugashirisam nakshatra (star) on the pournami (full moon) day. The month corresponds to mun-pani kalam (winter season) and falls in December–January in the Gregorian calendar.

In the Hindu lunar calendar, it corresponds to the ninth month of Agrahayana, falling in the Gregorian months of November–December.

In the Hindu solar calendar, it corresponds to the ninth month of Dhanu and begins with the Sun's entry into Sagittarius.

In the Vaishnava calendar, it corresponds to the ninth month of Keshava.

== Festivals ==
The month is dedicated to the worship of Vishnu and his consort Lakshmi. Adherents observe fasting on Thursdays of the month, and perform a special puja to Lakshmi for wealth and prosperity. Women draw kolams or rangoli early in the morning. Devotees visit temples each morning and recite the work Tiruppavai by the poet-saint Andal.

Vaikuntha Ekadashi is observed on the ekadashi (eleventh lunar day) thithi of the Krishna Paksha (waxing moon) of the month. Vaikuntha Dvaram (a representation of the gate to Vishnu's abode, Vaikuntha) is opened in Vishnu temples on the only this day of the year. Special prayers, and chanting of mantras are accompanies with pujas, and yajnas. According to the Vishnu Purana, fasting on Vaikuntha Ekadashi is equivalent to fasting on the remaining 23 ekadashis of the year, and is said to give people passage to Vaikuntha after earthly life.

Tamils observe Hanuman Jayanti in the month of Margazhi. It is commemorated on the day when the mula nakshatra occurs on the amavasai (new moon) day. On this day, devotees perform special pujas and abhishekams, recite mantras, and offer betel leaves, and vadas to the deity. Tiruvatirai is a Tamil festival dedicated to Shiva during this period, which commemorates the occasion of his performance of the cosmic dance tandava.

== See also ==
- Astronomical basis of the Hindu calendar
- Hindu astronomy
