= Purattasi =

- Native name: Puraṭṭāsi
- Calendar: Tamil calendar
- Month number: 6
- Number of days: 30 or 31
- Season: Kār (monsoon)
- Gregorian equivalent: September–October
- Significant days: Navaratri; Ayudha Puja; Vijaya Dashami

Purattasi is the sixth month of the Tamil calendar. The name of the month is derived from the position of the Moon near the Pooratathi nakshatra (star) on the pournami (full moon) day. The month corresponds to kar kaalam (monsoon season) and falls in September–October in the Gregorian calendar.

In the Hindu lunar calendar, it corresponds to the sixth month of Bhadrapada, falling in the Gregorian months of August–September.

In the Hindu solar calendar, it corresponds to the sixth month of Kanya and begins with the Sun's entry into Virgo.

In the Vaishnav calendar, it corresponds to the sixth month of Hrishikesha.

== Festivals ==
Navaratri is a nine‑day festival dedicated to the Hindu goddesses Durga, Lakshmi, and Saraswati. It starts from the Prathamai (first lunar day) thithi after amavasai (new moon), and ends on the Navami thithi on the ninth day. The festival involves fasting, special pujas, and various cultural activities.

Saraswati Puja or Ayudha Puja is celebrated on the ninth day of Navaratri. This day involves the worship of various tools, instruments, and books, and is dedicated to Saraswati, the Hindu goddess of wisdom. In households and institutions, materials and implements are cleaned and decorated, with special pujas. Vijayadashami is celebrated on Dashami (tenth day) thithi, and marks the end of Navaratri festivities. It commemorates god Rama's victory over Ravana.

== See also ==
- Astronomical basis of the Hindu calendar
- Hindu astronomy
