= Season =

Division of the year

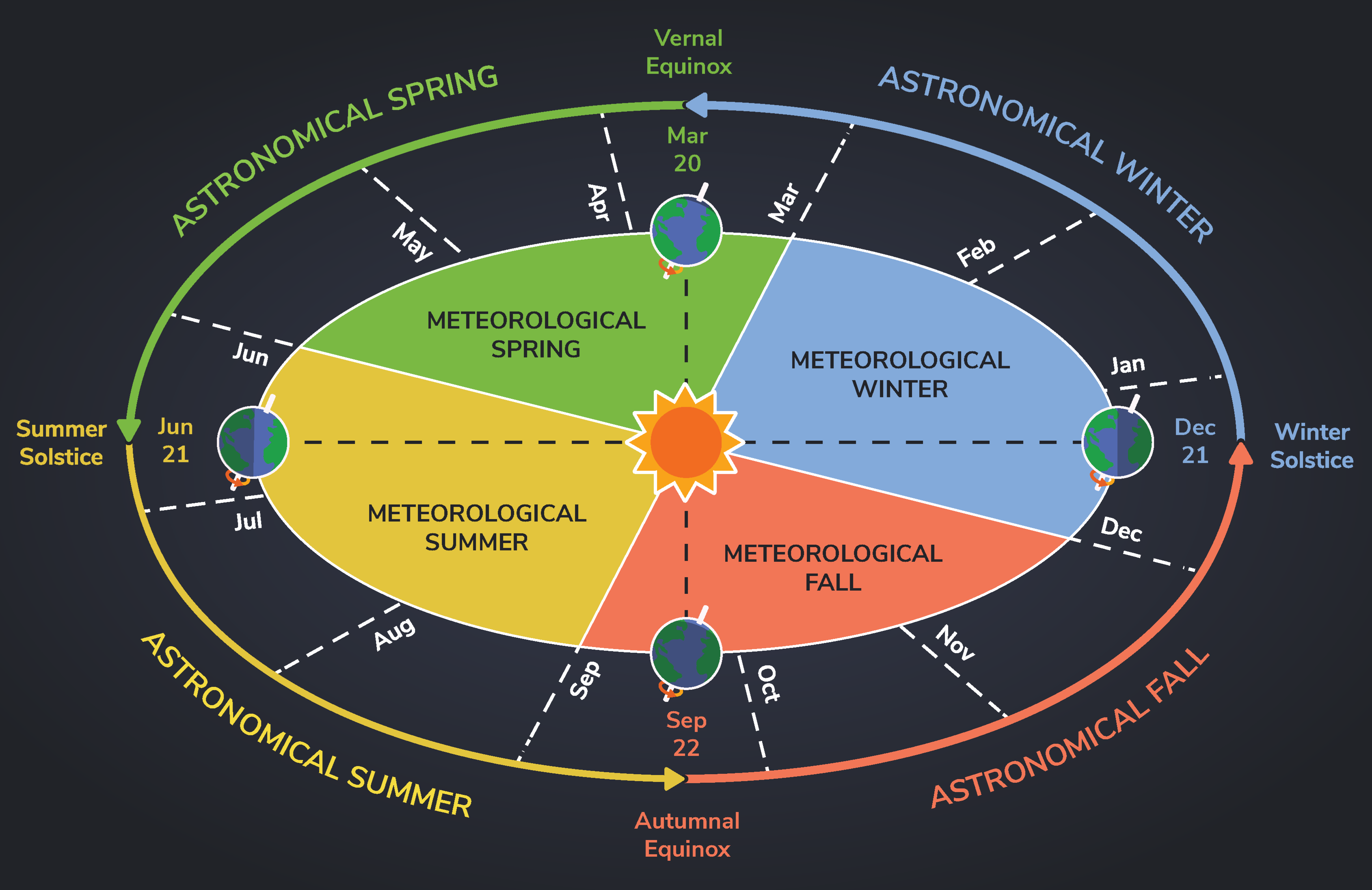
The astronomical and meteorological periods of the four-seasons reckoning across the year at the Northern Hemisphere, displayed as segments of Earth's orbit. Astronomically a season encompasses the time between an equinox and solstice. Meteorologically seasons are quarters of the annual temperature cycle, centered on the season characteristic temperatures, which trail equinox and solstice.

A season is a division of the year based on changes in weather, ecology, and the number of daylight hours in a given region. On Earth, seasons are the result of the axial parallelism of Earth's tilted orbit around the Sun. In temperate and polar regions, the seasons are marked by changes in the intensity of sunlight that reaches the Earth's surface, variations of which may cause animals to undergo hibernation or to migrate, and plants to be dormant. Various cultures define the number and nature of seasons based on regional variations, and as such there are a number of both modern and historical definitions of the seasons.

The Northern Hemisphere experiences most direct sunlight during May, June, and July (thus the traditional celebration of Midsummer in June), as the hemisphere faces the Sun. For the Southern Hemisphere, it is instead in November, December, and January. It is Earth's axial tilt that causes the Sun to be higher in the sky during the summer months, which increases the solar flux. Because of seasonal lag, June, July, and August are the warmest months in the Northern Hemisphere while December, January, and February are the warmest months in the Southern Hemisphere.

In temperate and sub-polar regions, four seasons based on the Gregorian calendar are generally recognized: spring, summer, autumn, and winter. Ecologists often use a six-season model for temperate climate regions which are not tied to any fixed calendar dates: prevernal, vernal, estival, serotinal, autumnal, and hibernal. Many tropical regions have two seasons: the rainy/wet/monsoon season and the dry season. Some have a third cool, mild, or harmattan season. "Seasons" can also be dictated by the timing of important ecological events such as hurricane season, tornado season, and wildfire season. Some examples of historical importance are the ancient Egyptian seasons—flood, growth, and low water—which were previously defined by the former annual flooding of the Nile in Egypt.

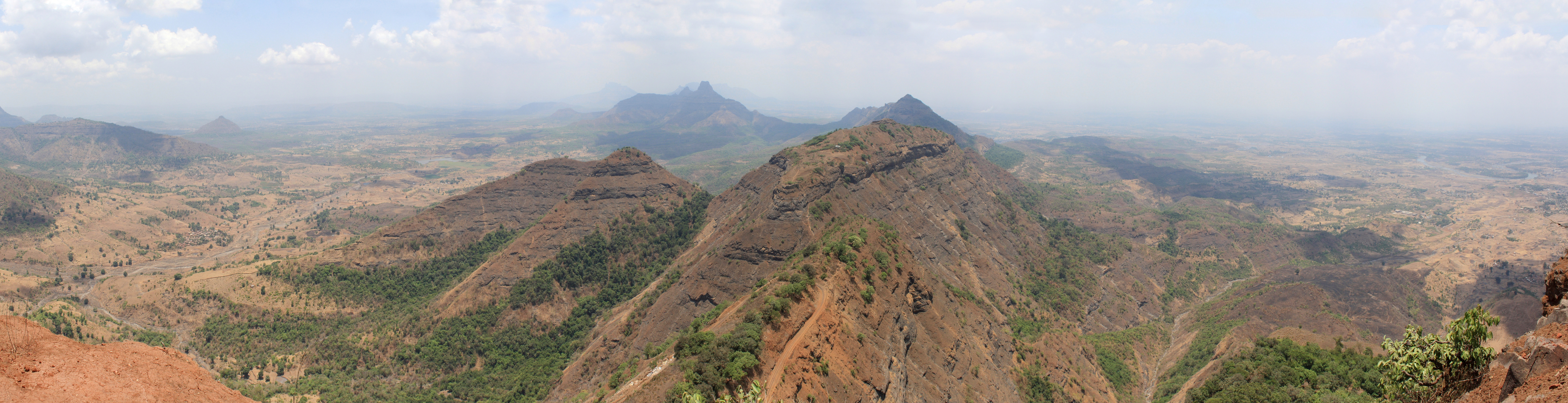
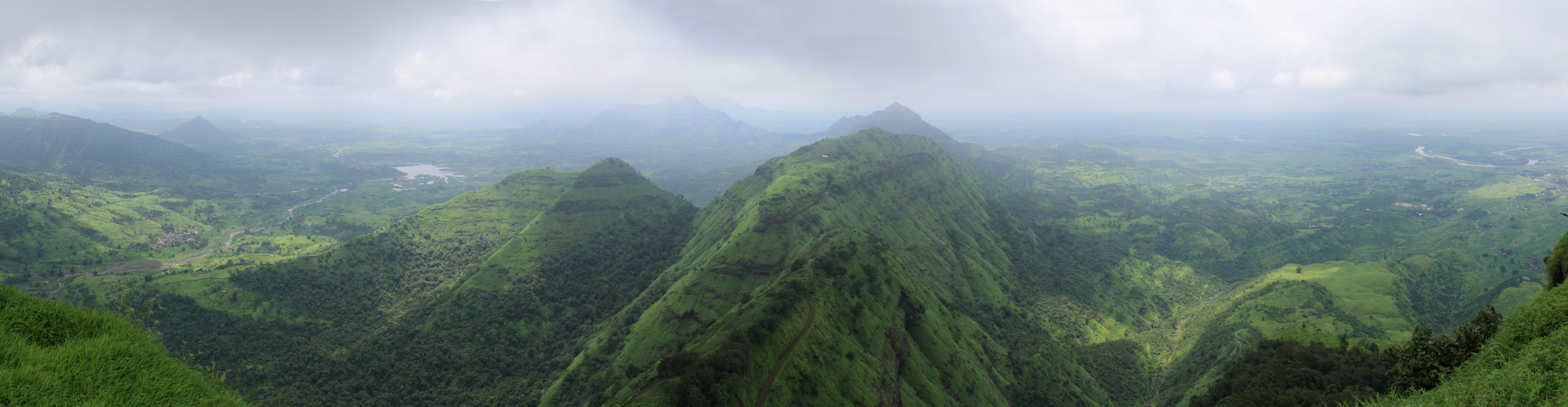
Tropical dry season and wet season/monsoon in Maharashtra, India

Seasons often hold special significance for agrarian societies, whose lives revolve around planting and harvest times, and the change of seasons is often attended by ritual. The definition of seasons is also cultural. In India, from ancient times to the present day, six seasons or Ritu based on south Asian religious or cultural calendars are recognised and identified for purposes such as agriculture and trade.

== Causes and effects ==
=== Axial parallelism ===
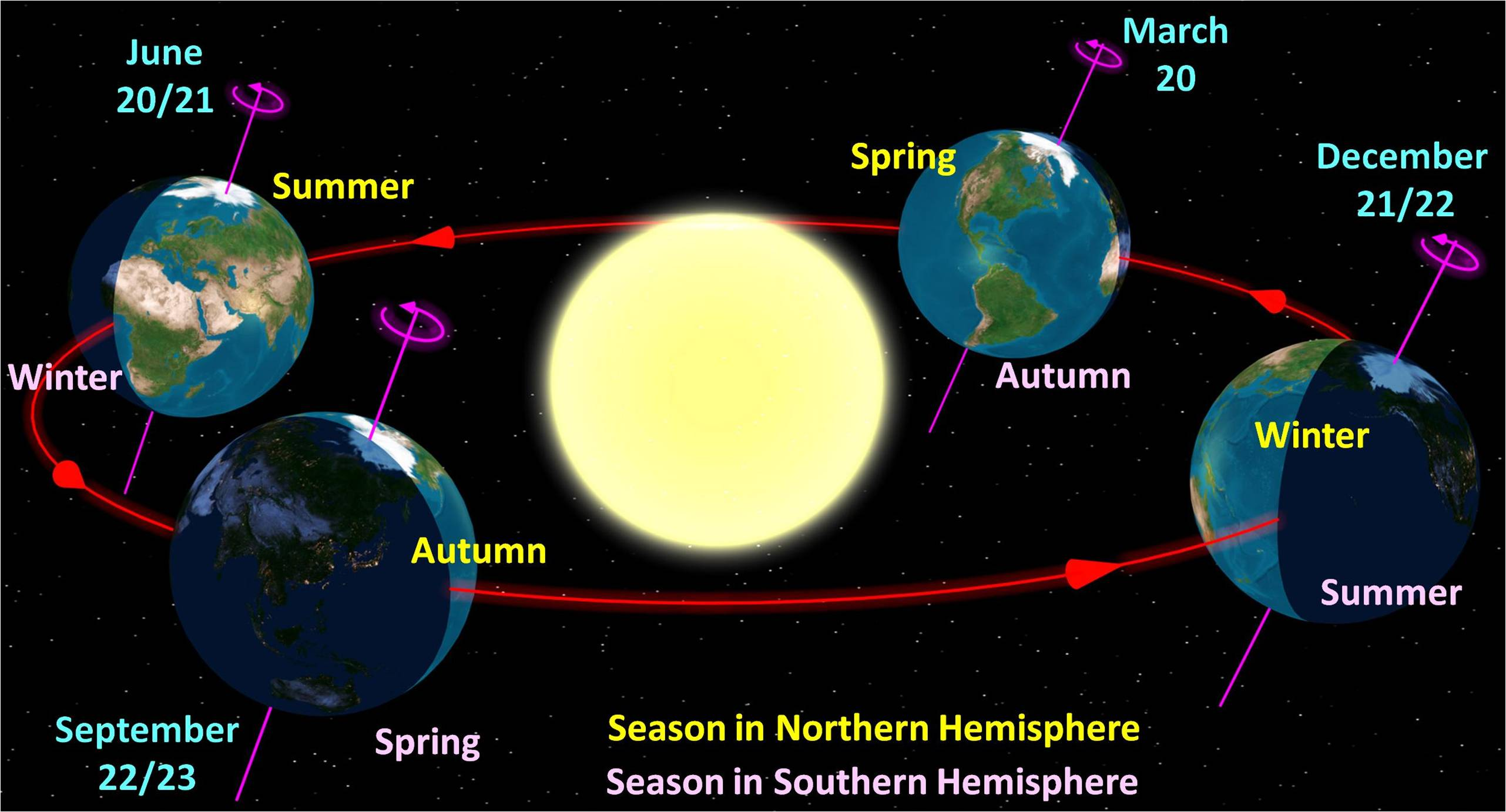
Axial parallelism is a characteristic of the Earth (and most other orbiting bodies in space) in which the direction of the axis remains parallel to itself throughout its orbit.

The Earth's orbit exhibits approximate axial parallelism, maintaining its direction toward Polaris (the "North Star") year-round. This is one of the primary reasons for the Earth's seasons, as illustrated by the diagram to the right. Minor variation in the direction of the axis, known as axial precession, takes place over the course of 26,000 years, and therefore is not noticeable to modern human civilization.

=== Axial tilt ===
Due to the Earth's tilt relative to the Sun, the solar declination line oscillates between the Tropic of Cancer (located at latitude 23.4° North) and the Tropic of Capricorn (located at latitude 23.4° South).

This diagram shows how the tilt of Earth's axis aligns with incoming sunlight around the winter solstice of the Northern Hemisphere. Regardless of the time of day (i.e. the Earth's rotation on its axis), the North Pole will be dark and the South Pole will be illuminated; see also arctic winter. In addition to the density of incident light, the dissipation of light in the atmosphere is greater when it falls at a shallow angle.

The seasons result from the Earth's axis of rotation being tilted with respect to its orbital plane by an angle of approximately 23.4 degrees. (This tilt is also known as "obliquity of the ecliptic".)

Regardless of the time of year, the Northern Hemisphere and Southern Hemisphere always experience opposite seasons. This is because during summer or winter, one part of the planet is more directly exposed to the rays of the Sun than the other, and this exposure alternates as the Earth revolves in its orbit.

For approximately half of the year (from around March 20 to around September 22), the Northern Hemisphere tips toward the Sun, with the maximum amount occurring on about June 21. For the other half of the year, the same happens, but in the Southern Hemisphere instead of the Northern, with the maximum around December 21. The two instants when the Sun is directly overhead at the Equator are the equinoxes. Also at that moment, both the North Pole and the South Pole of the Earth are just on the terminator, and hence day and night are equally divided between the two hemispheres. Around the March equinox, the Northern Hemisphere will be experiencing spring as the hours of daylight increase, and the Southern Hemisphere is experiencing autumn as daylight hours shorten.

The effect of axial tilt is observable as the change in day length and the altitude of the Sun at solar noon (the Sun's culmination) during the year. The low angle of the Sun during the winter months means that incoming rays of solar radiation are spread over a larger area of the Earth's surface, so the light received is more indirect and of lower intensity. Between this effect and the shorter daylight hours, the axial tilt of the Earth accounts for most of the seasonal variation in climate in both hemispheres.

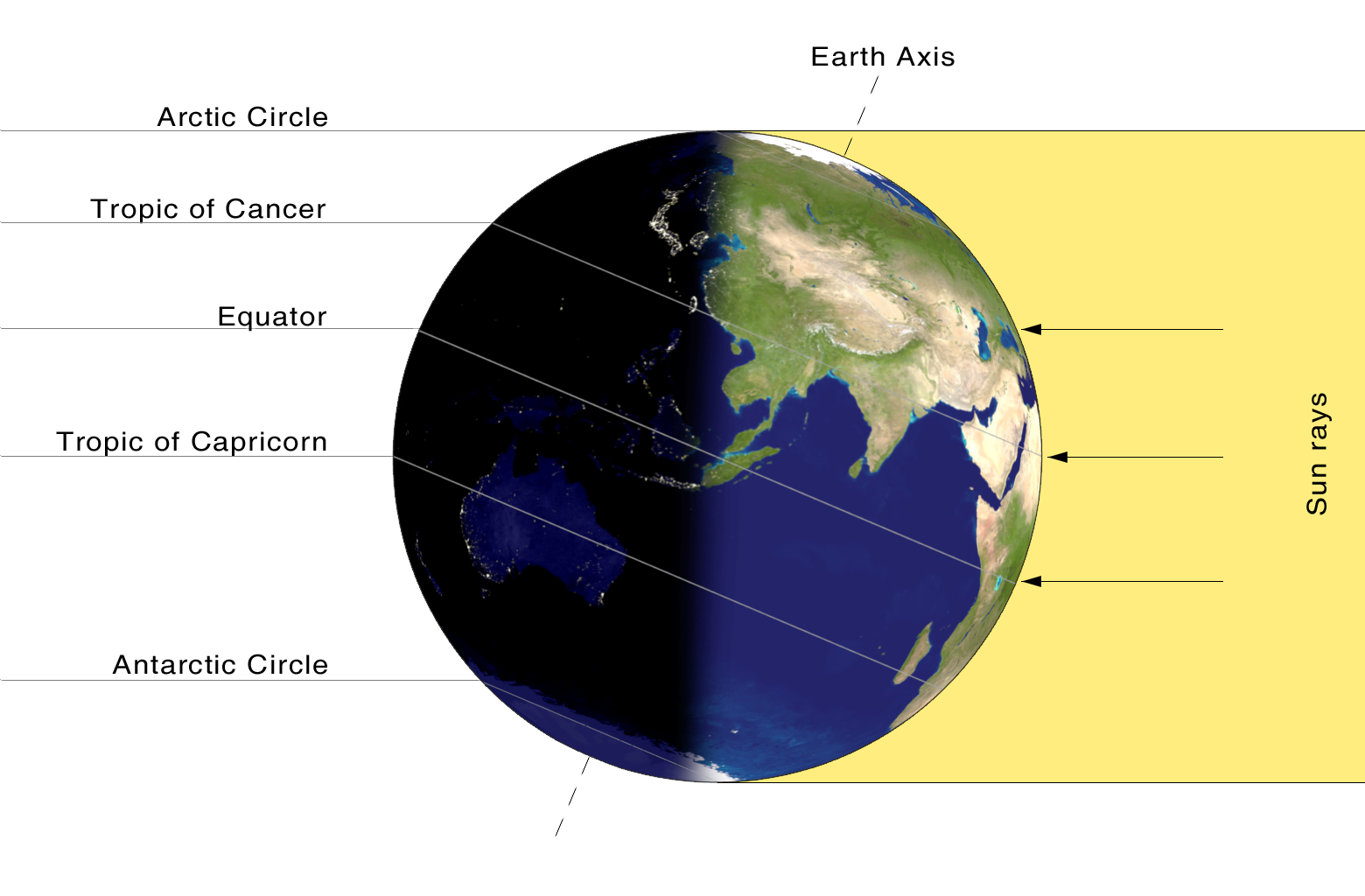
Illumination of Earth by Sun at the northern solstice

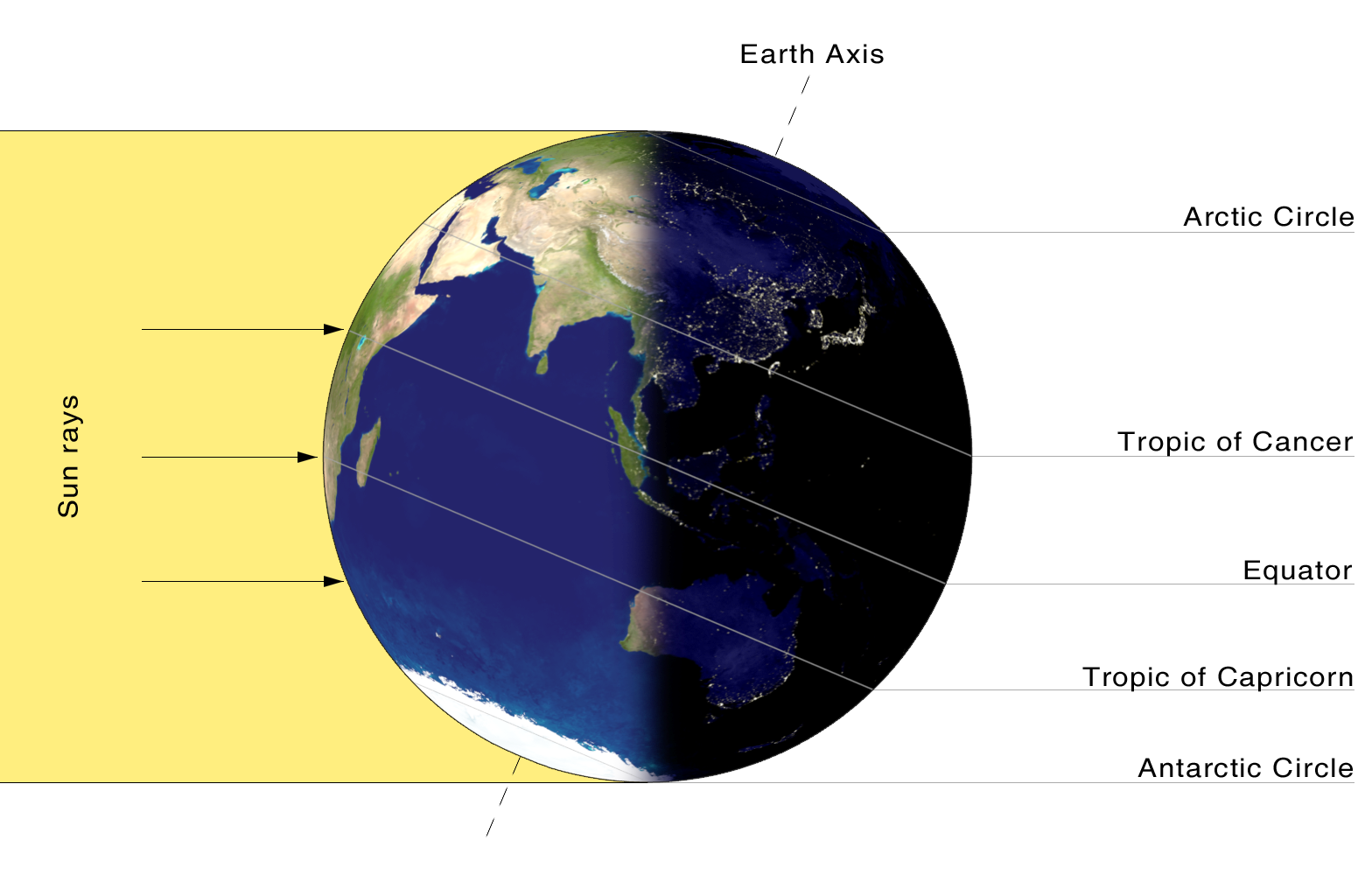
Illumination of Earth by Sun at the southern solstice

Illumination of Earth at each change of astronomical season

Animation of Earth as seen daily from the Sun looking at UTC+02:00, showing the solstice and changing seasons

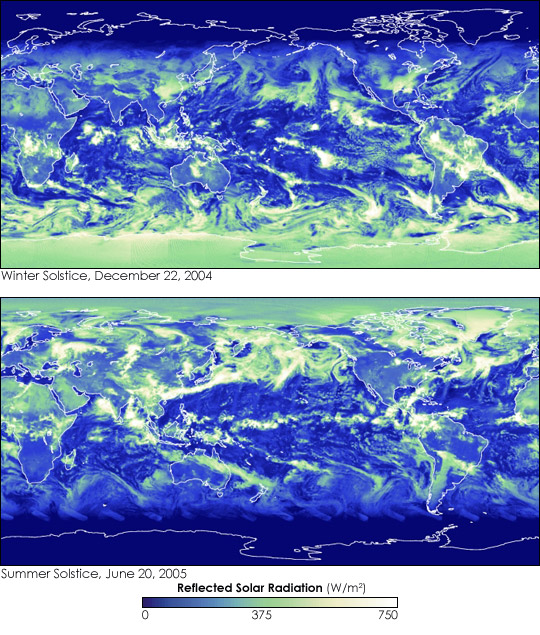
Two images showing the amount of reflected sunlight at southern and northern summer solstices respectively (watts / m^{2})

=== Elliptical Earth orbit ===
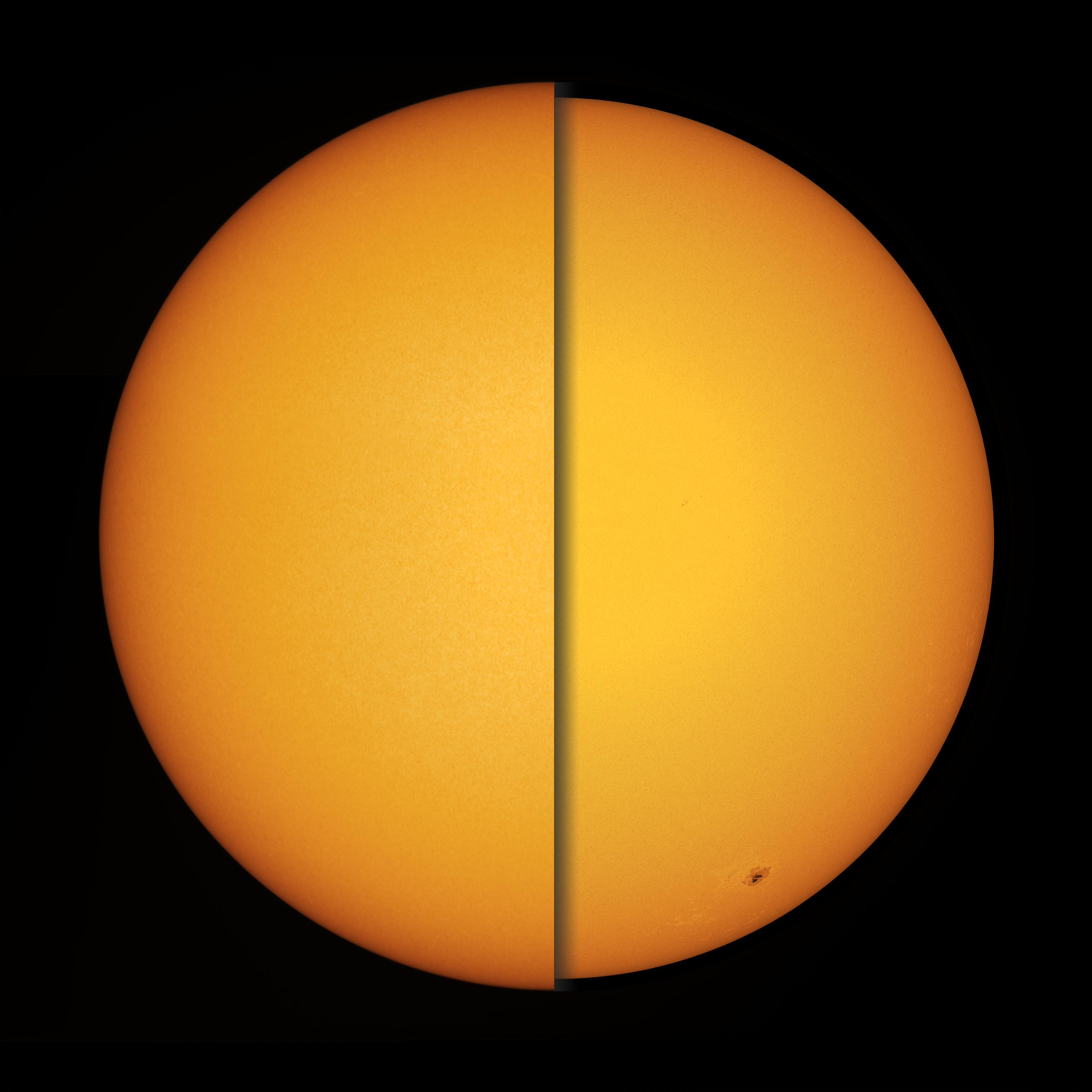
Angular size of the Sun at Earth's orbital periapsis called perihelion (max./closest, 2. to 5. January) and at apoapsis called aphelion (min./furthest, 3. to 6. July). The resulting 7% difference in solar intensity does not overpower geographic factors of climate, with seasons staying more moderate on the Southern Hemisphere due to having less landmass.

Compared to axial parallelism and axial tilt, other factors contribute little to seasonal temperature changes. The seasons are not the result of the variation in Earth's distance to the Sun because of its elliptical orbit. In fact, Earth reaches perihelion (the point in its orbit closest to the Sun) in January, and it reaches aphelion (the point farthest from the Sun) in July, so the slight contribution of orbital eccentricity opposes the temperature trends of the seasons in the Northern Hemisphere. In general, the effect of orbital eccentricity on Earth's seasons is a 7% variation in sunlight received.

Orbital eccentricity can influence temperatures, but on Earth, this effect is small and is more than counteracted by other factors; research shows that the Earth as a whole is actually slightly warmer when farther from the Sun. This is because the Northern Hemisphere has more land than the Southern, and land warms more readily than sea. Any noticeable intensification of southern winters and summers due to Earth's elliptical orbit is mitigated by the abundance of water in the Southern Hemisphere.

=== Maritime and hemispheric ===
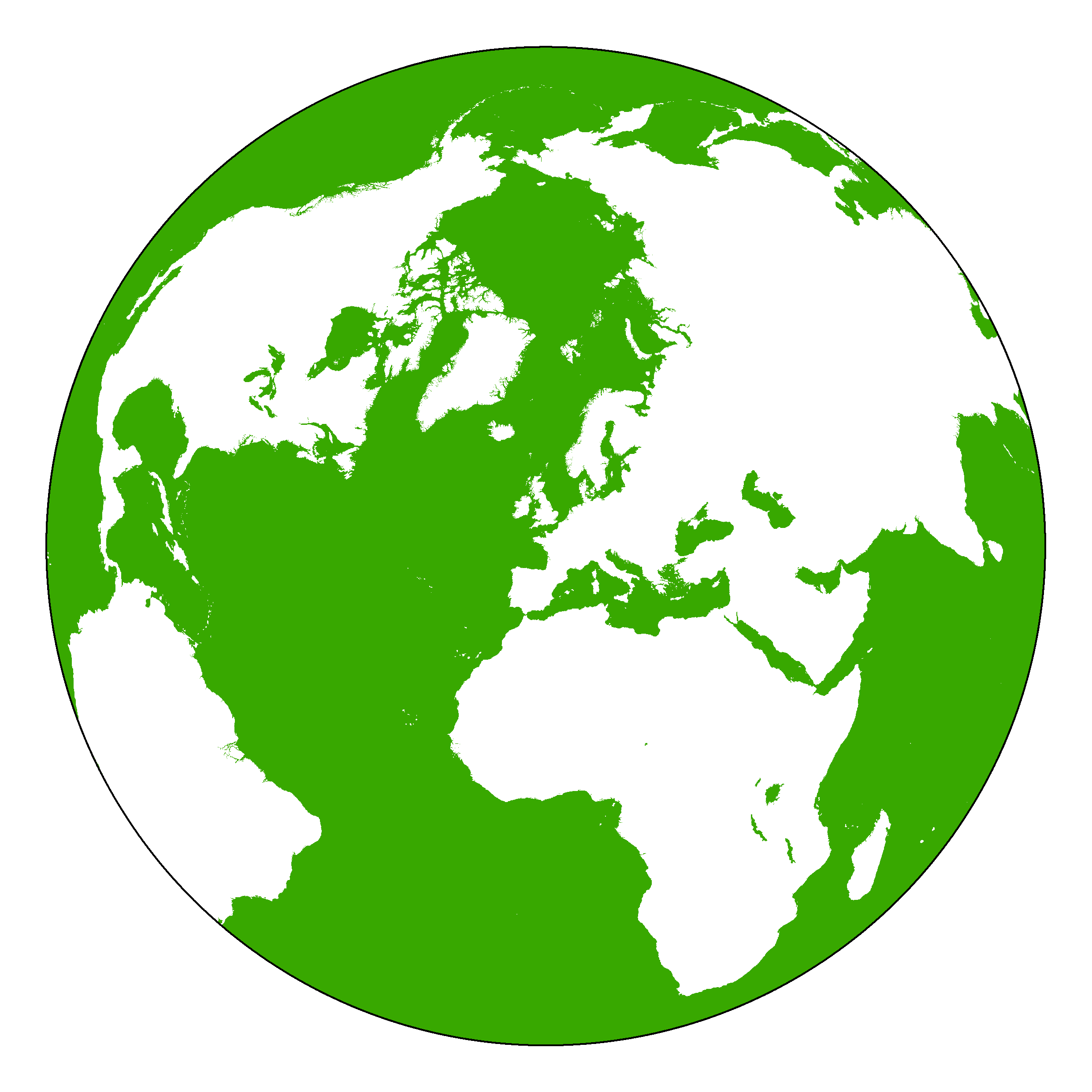
Land hemisphere

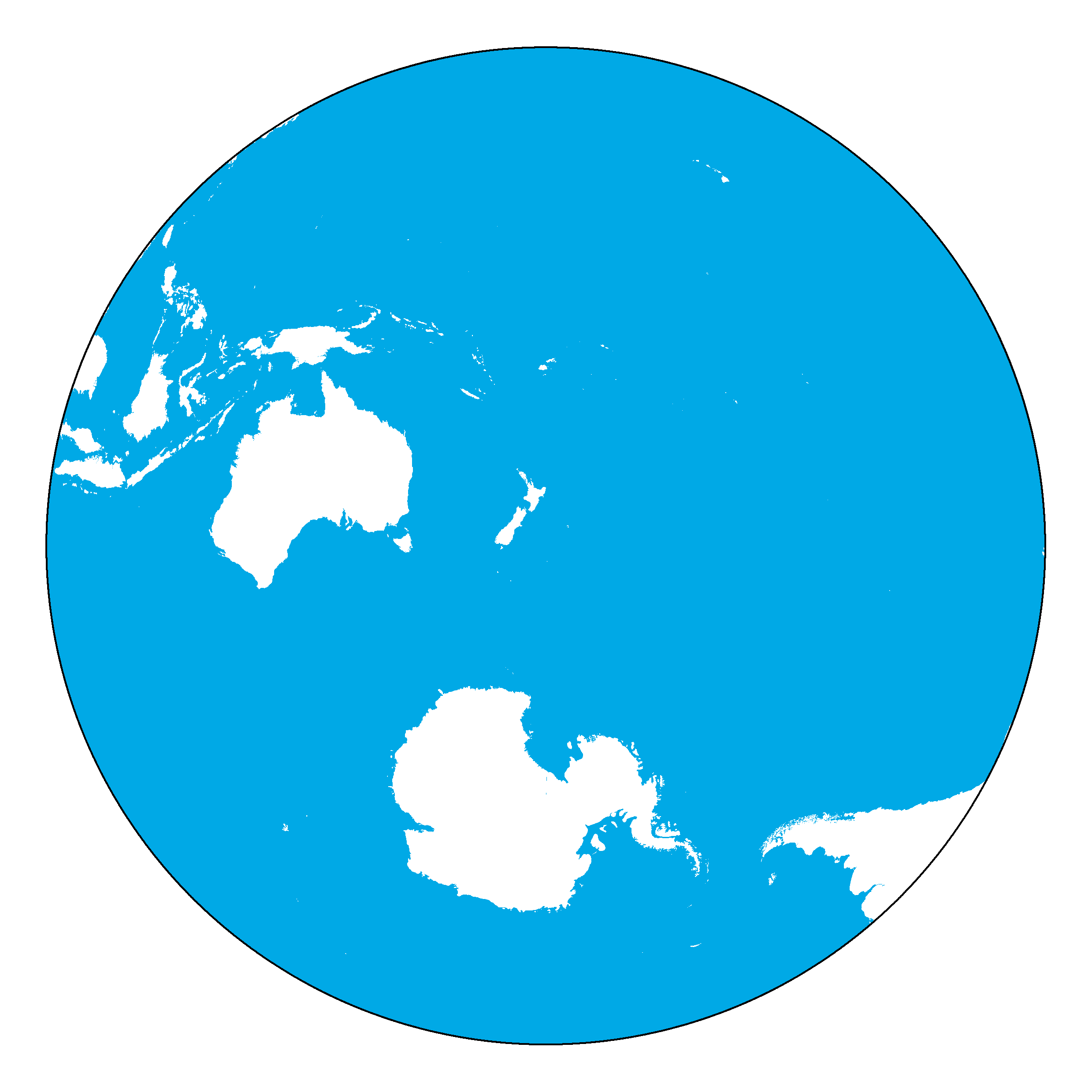
Water hemisphere

Front-view equal-area maps of Land and water hemispheres

Seasonal weather fluctuations (changes) also depend on factors such as proximity to oceans or other large bodies of water, currents in those oceans, El Niño/ENSO and other oceanic cycles, and prevailing winds.

In the temperate and polar regions, seasons are marked by changes in the amount of sunlight, which in turn often causes cycles of dormancy in plants and hibernation in animals. These effects vary with latitude and with proximity to bodies of water. For example, the South Pole is in the middle of the continent of Antarctica and therefore a considerable distance from the moderating influence of the southern oceans. The North Pole is in the Arctic Ocean, and thus its temperature extremes are buffered by the water. The result is that the South Pole is consistently colder during the southern winter than the North Pole during the northern winter.

The seasonal cycle in the polar and temperate zones of one hemisphere is opposite to that of the other. When it is summer in the Northern Hemisphere, it is winter in the Southern, and vice versa.

=== Tropics ===
Animation of seasonal differences, notably the snow cover in the Northern Hemisphere

The tropical and (to a lesser degree) subtropical regions see little annual fluctuation of sunlight and temperature due to Earth's moderate 23.4-degree tilt being insufficient to appreciably affect the strength of the Sun's rays annually. The slight differences between the solstices and the equinoxes cause seasonal shifts along a rainy low-pressure belt called the Intertropical Convergence Zone (ICZ). As a result, the amount of precipitation tends to vary more dramatically than the average temperature or daylight hours. When the ICZ is north of the Equator, the northern tropics experience their wet season while the southern tropics have their dry season. This pattern reverses when the ICZ migrates to a position south of the Equator.

=== Mid-latitude thermal lag ===
In meteorological terms, the solstices (the maximum and minimum insolation) do not fall in the middles of summer and winter. The heights of these seasons occur up to 7 weeks later because of seasonal lag. Seasons, though, are not always defined in meteorological terms.

In astronomical reckoning by hours of daylight alone, the solstices and equinoxes are in the middle of the respective seasons. Because of seasonal lag due to thermal absorption and release by the oceans, regions with a continental climate, which predominate in the Northern Hemisphere, often consider these four dates to be the start of the seasons as in the diagram, with the cross-quarter days considered seasonal midpoints. The length of these seasons is not uniform because of Earth's elliptical orbit and its different speeds along that orbit.

== Four-season reckoning ==
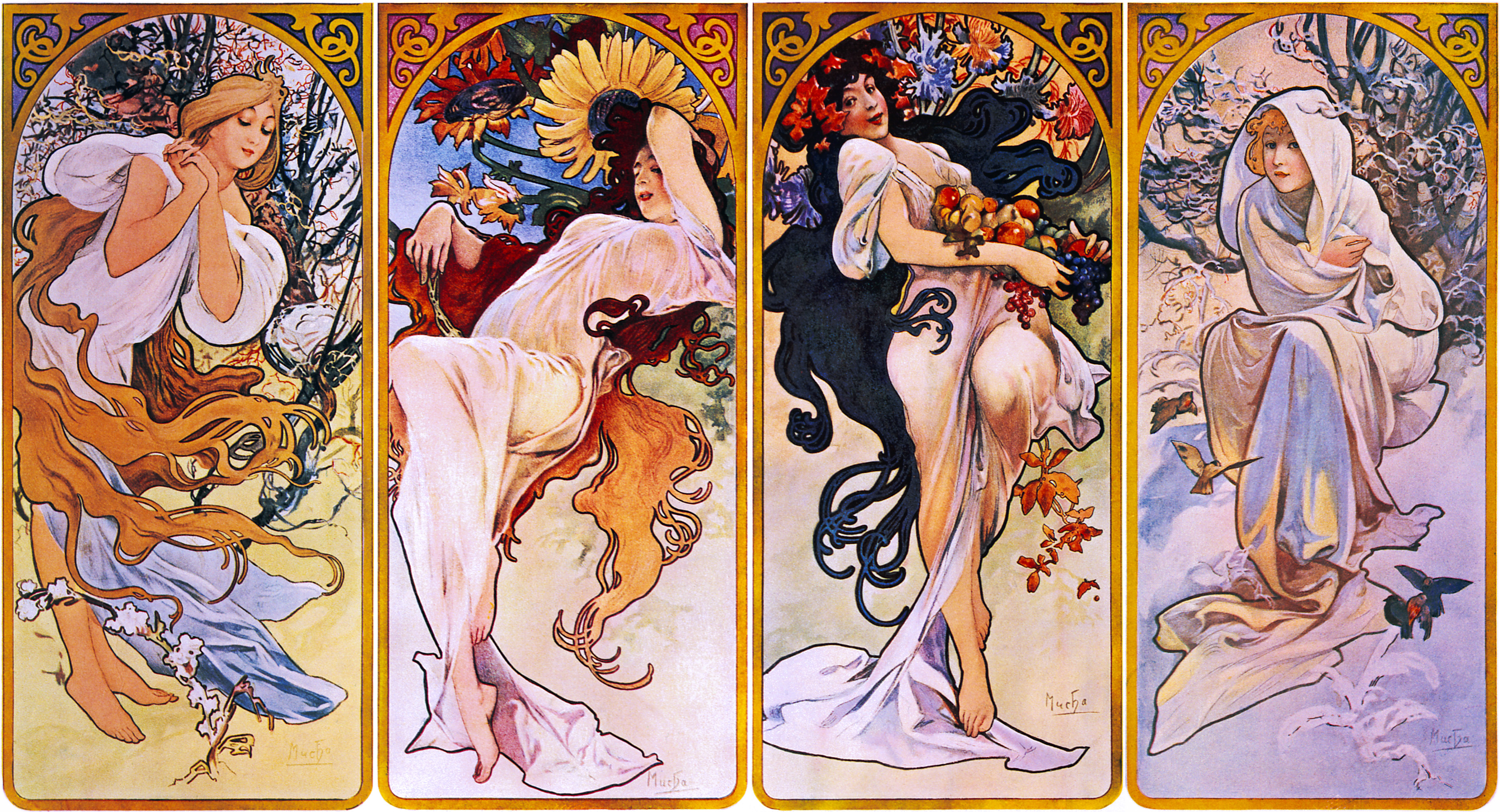
Four Seasons by Alphonse Mucha (1897)

Most calendar-based partitions use a four-season model to demarcate the warmest and coldest seasons, which are further separated by two intermediate seasons. Calendar-based reckoning defines the seasons in relative rather than absolute terms, so the coldest quarter-year is considered winter even if floral activity is regularly observed during it, despite the traditional association of flowers with spring and summer. The major exception is in the tropics where, as already noted, the winter season is not observed.

The four seasons have been in use since at least Roman times, as in Rerum rusticarum of Varro Varro says that spring, summer, autumn, and winter start on the 23rd day of the sun's passage through Aquarius, Taurus, Leo, and Scorpio, respectively. Nine years before he wrote, Julius Caesar had reformed the calendar, so Varro was able to assign the dates of February 7, May 9, August 11, and November 10 to the start of spring, summer, autumn, and winter.

=== Official ===
As noted, a variety of dates and even exact times are used in different countries or regions to mark changes of the calendar seasons. These observances are often declared "official" within their respective areas by the local or national media, even when the weather or climate is contradictory. These are mainly a matter of custom and not generally proclaimed by governments north or south of the equator for civil purposes.

=== Meteorological ===
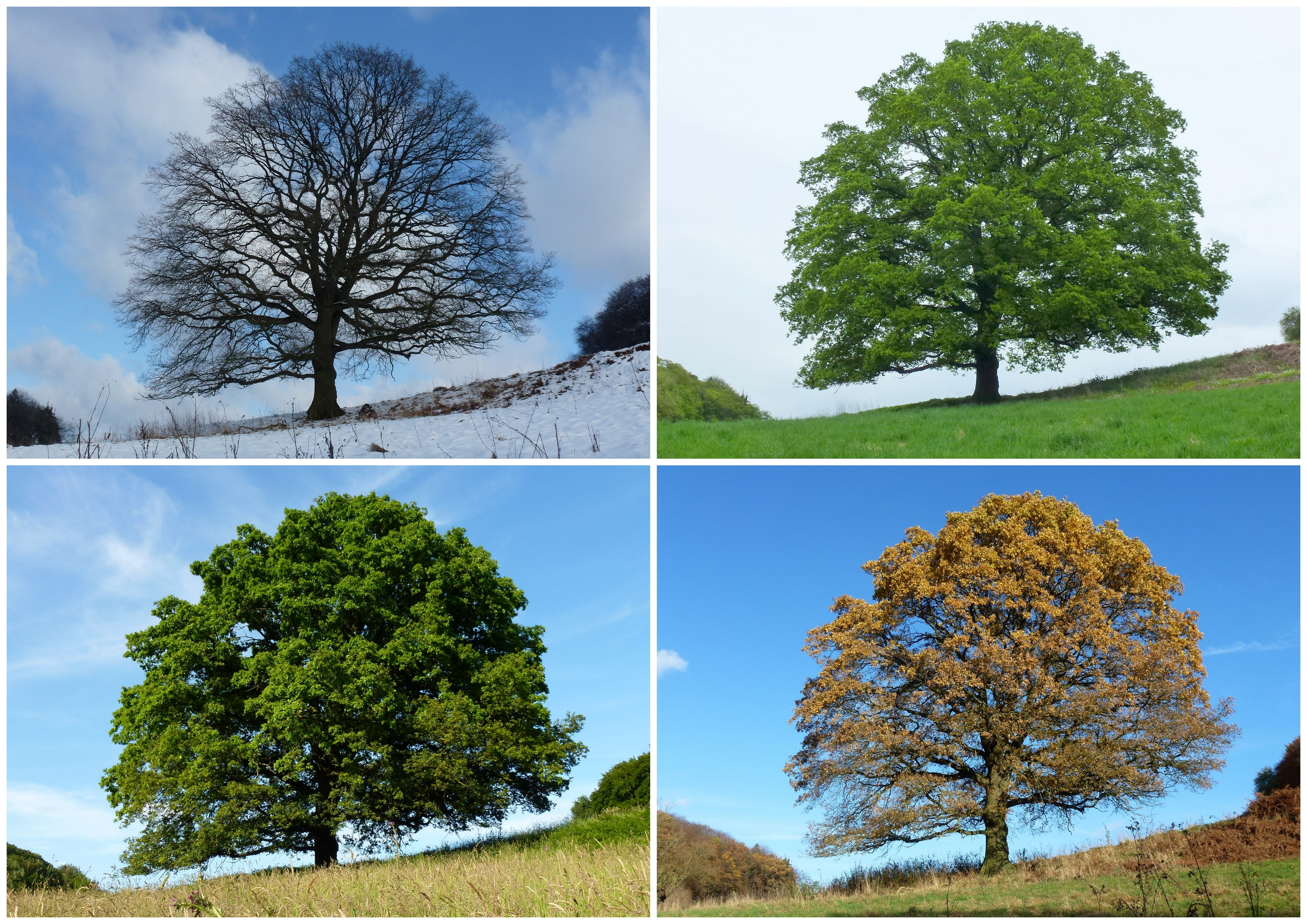
Four temperate and subpolar seasons: winter (top left), spring (top right), summer (bottom left), autumn

Meteorological seasons are reckoned by temperature, with summer being the hottest quarter of the year and winter the coldest quarter of the year. In 1780 the Societas Meteorologica Palatina (which became defunct in 1795), an early international organization for meteorology, defined seasons as groupings of three whole months as identified by the Gregorian calendar. According to this definition, for temperate areas in the northern hemisphere, spring begins on 1 March, summer on 1 June, autumn on 1 September, and winter on 1 December. For the southern hemisphere temperate zone, spring begins on 1 September, summer on 1 December, autumn on 1 March, and winter on 1 June. In Australasia the meteorological terms for seasons apply to the temperate zone that occupies all of New Zealand, New South Wales, Victoria, Tasmania, the south-eastern corner of South Australia and the south-west of Western Australia, and the south east Queensland areas south of Brisbane.

Meteorological temperate seasons
Northern hemisphere	Southern hemisphere	Start date	End date
Spring	Autumn	1 March	31 May
Summer	Winter	1 June	31 August
Autumn	Spring	1 September	30 November
Winter	Summer	1 December	28 February (29th if leap year)

In Sweden and Finland, meteorologists and news outlets use the concept of thermal seasons, which are defined based on mean daily temperatures. The beginning of spring is defined as when the mean daily temperature permanently rises above 0 °C. The beginning of summer is defined as when the temperature permanently rises above +10 °C, autumn as when the temperature permanently falls below +10 °C, and winter as when the temperature permanently falls below 0 °C. In Finland, "permanently" is defined as when the mean daily averaged temperature remains above or below the defined limit for seven consecutive days. (In Sweden the number of days ranges from 5 to 7 depending on the season.) This implies two things:

- the seasons do not begin on fixed dates and must be determined by observation and are known only after the fact,
- the seasons begin on different dates in different parts of the country.

Surface air temperature
Diagram was calculated (abscisse: the 21st of each month). Calculation based on data published by Jones et al.	The picture shows Figure 7 as published by Jones, et al.

The India Meteorological Department (IMD) designates four climatological seasons:

- Winter, occurring from December to February. The year's coldest months are December and January, when temperatures average around 10–15 °C (50–59 °F) in the northwest; temperatures rise as one proceeds toward the equator, peaking around 20–25 °C (68–77 °F) in mainland India's southeast.
- Summer or pre-monsoon season, lasting from March to May. In western and southern regions, the hottest month is April; for northern regions of India, May is the hottest month. Temperatures average around 32–40 °C (90–104 °F) in most of the interior.
- Monsoon or rainy season, lasting from June to September. The season is dominated by the humid southwest summer monsoon, which slowly sweeps across the country beginning in late May or early June. Monsoon rains begin to recede from North India at the beginning of October. South India typically receives more rainfall.
- Post-monsoon or autumn season, lasting from October to November. In the northwest of India, October and November are usually cloudless. Tamil Nadu receives most of its annual precipitation in the northeast monsoon season.

In China, a common temperature-based reckoning holds that it is winter for the period when temperatures are below 10°C on average and summer for the period when temperatures are above 22°C on average. This means that areas with relatively extreme climates (such as the Paracel Islands and parts of the Tibetan Plateau) may be said to have summer all year round or winter all year round.

=== Astronomical ===
UT date and time of equinoxes and solstices on Earth
event	equinox		solstice		equinox		solstice	
month	March		June		September		December	
year	day	time	day	time	day	time	day	time
2016	20	04:31	20	22:35	22	14:21	21	10:45
2017	20	10:29	21	04:25	22	20:02	21	16:29
2018	20	16:15	21	10:07	23	01:54	21	22:22
2019	20	21:58	21	15:54	23	07:50	22	04:19
2020	20	03:50	20	21:43	22	13:31	21	10:03
2021	20	09:37	21	03:32	22	19:21	21	15:59
2022	20	15:33	21	09:14	23	01:04	21	21:48
2023	20	21:25	21	14:58	23	06:50	22	03:28
2024	20	03:07	20	20:51	22	12:44	21	09:20
2025	20	09:01	21	02:42	22	18:19	21	15:03
2026	20	14:46	21	08:25	23	00:06	21	20:50
2027	20	20:25	21	14:11	23	06:02	22	02:43
2028	20	02:17	20	20:02	22	11:45	21	08:20
2029	20	08:01	21	01:48	22	17:37	21	14:14
2030	20	13:51	21	07:31	22	23:27	21	20:09
2031	20	19:41	21	13:17	23	05:15	22	01:56
2032	20	01:23	20	19:09	22	11:11	21	07:57
2033	20	07:23	21	01:01	22	16:52	21	13:45
2034	20	13:18	21	06:45	22	22:41	21	19:35
2035	20	19:03	21	12:33	23	04:39	22	01:31
2036	20	01:02	20	18:31	22	10:23	21	07:12

Astronomical timing as the basis for designating the temperate seasons dates back at least to the Julian Calendar used by the ancient Romans. As mentioned above, Varro wrote that spring, summer, autumn, and winter start on the 23rd day of the Sun's passage through Aquarius, Taurus, Leo, and Scorpio, respectively, and that (in the Julian Calendar) these days were February 7, May 9, August 11, and November 10. He points out that the lengths are not equal, being 91 (in non-leap years), 94, 91, and 89 days for spring, summer, autumn, and winter, respectively. The midpoints of these seasons were March 24 or 25, June 25, September 25 or 26, and December 24 or 25, which are near to the equinoxes and solstices of his day.

Pliny the Elder, in his Natural History, mentions the two equinoxes and the two solstices and gives the lengths of the intervals (values which were fairly correct in his day but are no longer very correct because the perihelion has moved from December into January). He then defines the seasons of autumn, winter, spring, and summer as starting half-way through these intervals. He gives "the eighth day to the Kalends of January" (December 25) as the date of the winter solstice, though actually it occurred on the 22nd or 23rd at that time.

At the present time, the astronomical timing has winter starting at the winter solstice, spring at the spring equinox, and so on. This is used worldwide, although some countries like Australia, New Zealand, Pakistan and Russia prefer to use meteorological reckoning. The precise timing of the seasons is determined by the exact times of the Sun reaching the tropics of Cancer and Capricorn for the solstices and the times of the Sun's transit over the equator for the equinoxes, or a traditional date close to these times.

The following diagram shows the relation between the line of solstice and the line of apsides of Earth's elliptical orbit. The orbital ellipse (with eccentricity exaggerated for effect) goes through each of the six Earth images, which are sequentially the perihelion (periapsis—nearest point to the Sun) on anywhere from 2 January to 5 January, the point of March equinox on 19, 20 or 21 March, the point of June solstice on 20 or 21 June, the aphelion (apoapsis—farthest point from the Sun) on anywhere from 3 July to 6 July, the September equinox on 22 or 23 September, and the December solstice on 21 or 22 December.

Exaggerated illustration of Earth's elliptical orbit around the Sun, marking that the orbital extreme points (apoapsis and periapsis) are not the same as the four seasonal extreme points (equinox and solstice)

These "astronomical" seasons are not of equal length, because of the elliptical nature of the orbit of the Earth, as discovered by Johannes Kepler. From the March equinox it currently takes 92.75 days until the June solstice, then 93.65 days until the September equinox, 89.85 days until the December solstice and finally 88.99 days until the March equinox. Thus the time from the March equinox to the September equinox is 7.56 days longer than from the September equinox to the March equinox.

==== Variation due to calendar misalignment ====
The times of the equinoxes and solstices are not fixed with respect to the modern Gregorian calendar, but fall about six hours later every year, amounting to one full day in four years. They are reset by the occurrence of a leap year. The Gregorian calendar is designed to keep the March equinox no later than 21 March as accurately as is practical.

The calendar equinox (used in the calculation of Easter) is 21 March, the same date as in the Easter tables current at the time of the Council of Nicaea in AD 325. The calendar is therefore framed to prevent the astronomical equinox wandering onto 22 March. From Nicaea to the date of the reform, the years 500, 600, 700, 900, 1000, 1100, 1300, 1400, and 1500, which would not have been leap years in the Gregorian calendar, amount to nine extra days, but astronomers directed that ten days be removed. Because of this, the (proleptic) Gregorian calendar agrees with the Julian calendar in the third century of the Christian era, rather than in the fourth.

Currently, the most common equinox and solstice dates are March 20, June 21, September 22 or 23, and December 21; the four-year average slowly shifts to earlier times as a century progresses. This shift is a full day in about 128 years (compensated mainly by the century "leap year" rules of the Gregorian calendar); as 2000 was a leap year, the current shift has been progressing since the beginning of the last century, when equinoxes and solstices were relatively late. This also means that in many years of the twentieth century, the dates March 21, June 22, September 23, and December 22 were much more common, so older books teach (and older people may still remember) these dates.

All the times are given in UTC (roughly speaking, the time at Greenwich, ignoring British Summer Time). People living farther to the east (Asia and Australia), whose local times are in advance, see the astronomical seasons apparently start later; for example, in Tonga (UTC+13), an equinox occurred on September 24, 1999, a date on which the equinox will not fall again until 2103. On the other hand, people living far to the west (America), whose clocks run behind UTC, may experience an equinox as early as March 19.

==== Change over time ====
Over thousands of years, the Earth's axial tilt and orbital eccentricity vary (see Milankovitch cycles). The equinoxes and solstices move westward relative to the stars while the perihelion and aphelion move eastward. Thus, ten thousand years from now Earth's northern winter will occur at aphelion and northern summer at perihelion. The severity of seasonal change — the average temperature difference between summer and winter in location — will also change over time because the Earth's axial tilt fluctuates between 22.1 and 24.5 degrees.

Smaller irregularities in the times are caused by perturbations of the Moon and the other planets.

=== Solar ===
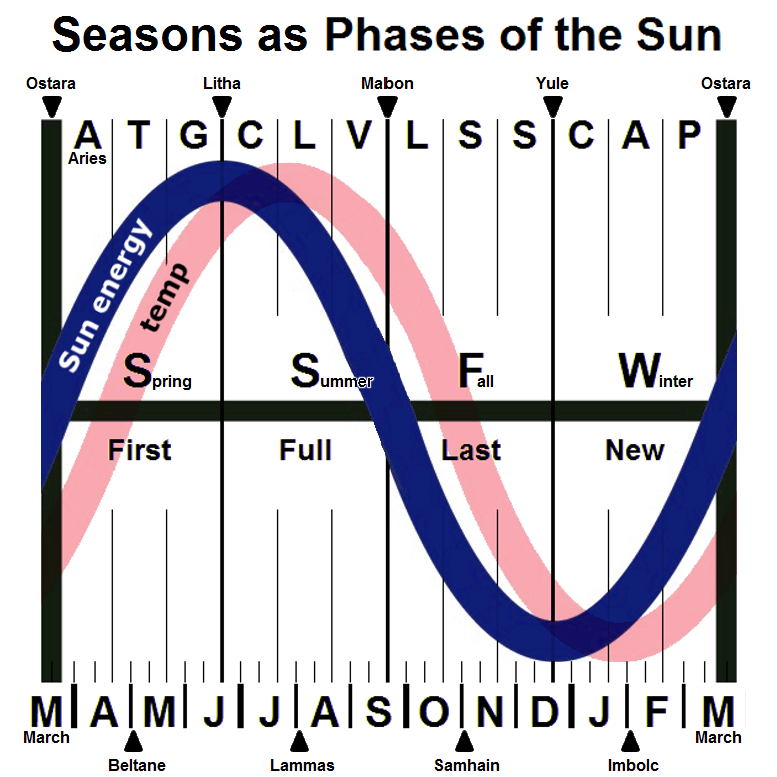
The annual cycle of insolation (Sun energy, shown in blue) with key points for seasons (middle), quarter days (top) and cross-quarter days (bottom) along with months (lower) and Zodiac houses (upper). The cycle of temperature (shown in pink) is delayed by seasonal lag.

Solar timing is based on insolation in which the solstices and equinoxes are seen as the midpoints of the seasons. This was the case with the seasons described by the Roman scholar Varro (see above). It was the method for reckoning seasons in medieval Europe, especially by the Celts, and is still ceremonially observed in Ireland and some East Asian countries. Summer is defined as the quarter of the year with the greatest insolation and winter as the quarter with the least.

The solar seasons change at the cross-quarter days, which are about 3–4 weeks earlier than the meteorological seasons and 6–7 weeks earlier than seasons starting at equinoxes and solstices. Thus, the day of greatest insolation is designated "midsummer" as noted in William Shakespeare's play A Midsummer Night's Dream, which is set on the summer solstice. On the Celtic calendar, the start of the seasons corresponds to four Pagan agricultural festivals – the traditional first day of winter is 1 November (Samhain, the Celtic origin of Halloween); spring starts 1 February (Celtic Imbolc); summer begins 1 May (Beltane, the Celtic origin of May Day); the first day of autumn is 1 August (Celtic Lughnasadh).

Irish seasons
Season	Start date	End date
Winter	1 November (All Saints' Day)	31 January
Spring	1 February (St. Brigid's Day)	30 April
Summer	1 May (May Day)	31 July
Autumn	1 August (Lughnasadh)	31 October (Hallowe'en)

==== Solar terms ====
The traditional calendar in China has 4 seasons based on 24 periods, twelve of which are called zhōngqi and twelve of which are known as jiéqi. These periods are collectively known in English as "solar terms" or "solar breaths". The four seasons chūn (春), xià (夏), qiū (秋), and dōng (冬)—translated as "spring", "summer", "autumn", and "winter"—each center on the respective solstice or equinox. Astronomically, the seasons are said to begin on Lichun (立春, "the start of spring") on about 4 February, Lixia (立夏) on about 6 May, Liqiu (立秋) on about 8 August, and Lidong (立冬) on about 8 November. This system forms the basis of other such systems in East Asian lunisolar calendars.

== Five-season reckoning ==
Some traditional calendars count a fifth season. In Europe, this is related to the English concept of Midsummer, High Summer or the Dog days, and related also to Spanish distinctions between primavera, estío and verano.

In the ancient Chinese Taoist philosophy the five-season cycle were related to Wuxing (Five Phases) cosmology. In this theory there was the additional quality added expressed as 'late summer', chángxià (長夏)the time of ripening or fruition. There is also across the Far East the related concept of a "plum rain" or rainy season, méiyǔ 梅雨 in Mandarin, jangma 장마 in Korean, tsuyu 梅雨 in Japanese.

== Six-season reckoning ==
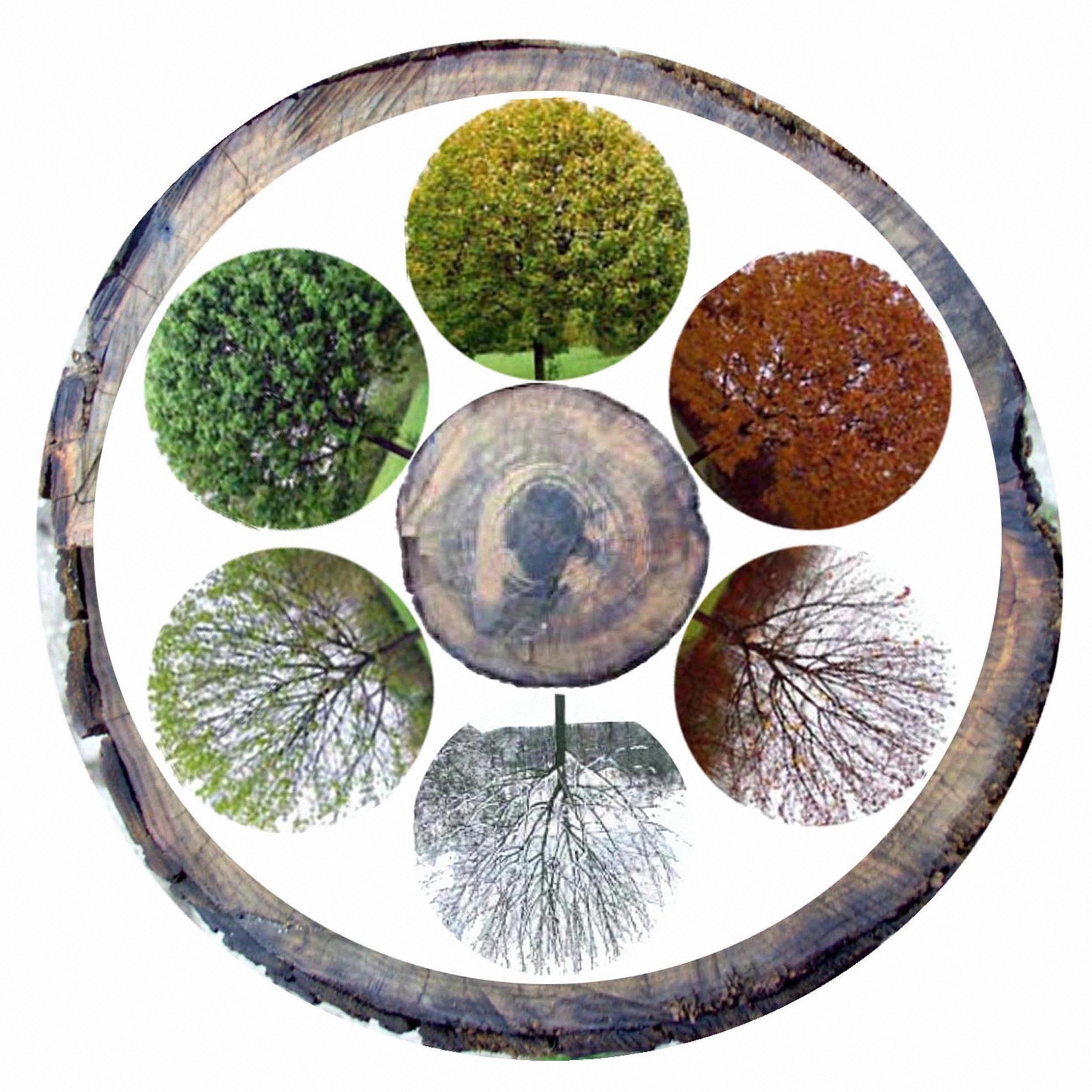
The six modern mid-latitude ecological seasons. From bottom, clockwise: prevernal, vernal, estival, serotinal, autumnal, hibernal

Some calendars in South Asia use a six-season partition where the number of seasons between summer and winter can number from one to three. The dates are fixed at even intervals of months.

In the Hindu calendar of tropical and subtropical India, there are six seasons or Ritu that are calendar-based in the sense of having fixed dates: Vasanta (spring), Grishma (summer), Varsha (monsoon), Sharada (autumn), Hemanta (early winter), and Shishira (prevernal or late winter). The six seasons are ascribed to two months each of the twelve months in the Hindu calendar. The rough correspondences are:

Hindu season	Start	End	Hindu months	Mapping to English names
Vasanta	Mid-March	Mid-May	Chaitra, Vaishakha	spring
Grishma	Mid-May	Mid-July	Jyeshtha, Ashadha	summer
Varshā	Mid-July	Mid-September	Shravana, Bhadrapada	monsoon
Sharada	Mid-September	Mid-November	Ashvin, Kartika	autumn
Hemanta	Mid-November	Mid-January	Agrahayana, Pausha	early winter or late autumn
Shishira	Mid-January	Mid-March	Magha, Phalguna	prevernal or late winter

The Bengali Calendar is similar but differs in start and end times. It has the following seasons or ritu:

Bengali season (ঋতু)	Start	End	Bengali months	Mapping to English names
Grīshmo (গ্রীষ্ম)(summer)	Mid-April	Mid-June	Boishakh, Joishtho	Summer
Bôrsha (বর্ষা) (monsoon)	Mid-June	Mid-August	Asharh, Srabon	Monsoon
Shôrôt (শরৎ) (autumn/ fall)	Mid-August	Mid-October	Bhadro, Ashwin	Autumn
Hemônto (হেমন্ত) (frost/ late autumn)	Mid-October	Mid-December	Kartik, Ogrohayon	Late Autumn
Shīto (শীত) (winter)	Mid-December	Mid-February	Poush, Magh	Winter
Bôsônto বসন্ত(spring)	Mid-February	Mid-April	Falgun, Choitro	Spring

The Odia Calendar is similar but differs in start and end times.

Odia Season (ଋତୁ)	Season	Odia months	Gregorian
ଗ୍ରୀଷ୍ମ; Grīṣmå	Summer	Båiśākhå–Jyeṣṭhå	April–June
ବର୍ଷା Bårṣā	Monsoon	Āṣāṛhå–Śrābåṇ	June–August
ଶରତ; Śåråt	Autumn	Bhādråb–Āświn	August–October
ହେମନ୍ତ; Hemåntå	Pre-Winter	Kārtik–Mārgåśir	October–December
ଶୀତ; Śīt	Winter	Pouṣå–Māghå	December–February
ବସନ୍ତ; Båsåntå	Spring	Fālgun–Chåitrå	February–April

The Tamil calendar follows a similar pattern of six seasons

Tamil season	Gregorian months	Tamil months
MuthuVenil (summer)	April 15 to June 14	Chithirai and Vaikasi
Kaar (monsoon)	June 15 to August 14	Aani and Aadi
Kulir (autumn)	August 15 to October 14	Avani and Purattasi
MunPani (winter)	October 15 to December 14	Aipasi and Karthikai
PinPani (prevernal)	December 15 to February 14	Margazhi and Thai
IlaVenil (spring)	February 15 to April 14	Maasi and Panguni

== Non-calendar-based reckoning ==
Seasonal changes of a tree over a year

Ecologically speaking, a season is a period of the year in which only certain types of floral and animal events happen (e.g.: flowers bloom—spring; hedgehogs hibernate—winter). So, if a change in daily floral and animal events can be observed, the season is changing. In this sense, ecological seasons are defined in absolute terms, unlike calendar-based methods in which the seasons are relative. If specific conditions associated with a particular ecological season do not normally occur in a particular region, then that area cannot be said to experience that season on a regular basis.

=== Modern mid-latitude ecological ===
Six ecological seasons can be distinguished without fixed calendar-based dates like the meteorological and astronomical seasons. Oceanic regions tend to experience the beginning of the hibernal season up to a month later than continental climates. Conversely, prevernal and vernal seasons begin up to a month earlier near oceanic and coastal areas. For example, prevernal crocus blooms typically appear as early as February in coastal areas of British Columbia and the British Isles, but generally do not appear until March or April in locations like the Midwestern United States and parts of eastern Europe. The actual dates for each season vary by climate region and can shift from one year to the next. Average dates listed here are for mild and cool temperate climate zones in the Northern Hemisphere:

- Prevernal (early or pre-spring): Begins February (mild temperate), to March (cool temperate). Deciduous tree buds begin to swell. Some types of migrating birds fly from winter to summer habitats.
- Vernal (spring): Begins mid March (mild temperate), to late April (cool temperate). Tree buds burst into leaves. Birds establish territories and begin mating and nesting.
- Estival (high summer): Begins June in most temperate climates. Trees in full leaf. Birds hatch and raise offspring.
- Serotinal (late summer): Generally begins mid to late August. Deciduous leaves begin to change color in higher latitude locations (above 45 north). Young birds reach maturity and join other adult birds preparing for autumn migration. The traditional "harvest season" begins by early September.
- Autumnal (autumn): Generally begins mid to late September. Tree leaves in full color then turn brown and fall to the ground. Birds migrate back to wintering areas.
- Hibernal (winter): Begins December (mild temperate), November (cool temperate). Deciduous trees are bare and fallen leaves begin to decay. Migrating birds settled in winter habitats.

=== Indigenous ecological ===
Indigenous people in polar, temperate and tropical climates of northern Eurasia, the Americas, Africa, Asia, Oceania, and Australia have traditionally defined the seasons ecologically by observing the activity of the plants, animals and weather around them. Each separate tribal group traditionally observes different seasons determined according to local criteria that can vary from the hibernation of polar bears on the arctic tundras to the growing seasons of plants in the tropical rainforests. In Australia, some tribes have up to eight seasons in a year, as do the Sami people in Scandinavia. Many indigenous people who no longer live directly off the land in traditional often nomadic styles, now observe modern methods of seasonal reckoning according to what is customary in their particular country or region.

The North American Cree and possibly other Algonquian speaking peoples used or still use a 6-season system. The extra two seasons denoting the freezing and breaking up of the ice on rivers and lakes.

Cree season	Approximate months	English translation
Pipon	Jan/Feb	Winter
Sekwun	Mar/Apr	Break-up
Mithoskumin	May/Jun	Spring
Nepin	Jul/Aug	Summer
Tukwakin	Sep/Oct	Autumn
Mikiskaw	Nov/Dec	Freeze-up

The Noongar people of South-West Western Australia recognise maar-keyen bonar, or six seasons. Each season's arrival is heralded not by a calendar date, but by environmental factors such as changing winds, flowering plants, temperature and migration patterns and lasts approximately two standard calendar months. The seasons also correlate to aspects of the human condition, intrinsically linking the lives of the people to the world that surrounds them and also dictating their movements, as with each season, various parts of country would be visited which were particularly abundant or safe from the elements.

Noongar season	Approximate months	Cultural parallel
Birak (first summer)	December to January	Season of the young
Bunuru (second summer)	February to March	Season of adolescence
Djeran (autumn)	April to May	Season of adulthood
Makuru (the first rains)	June to July	Fertility season
Djilba (the second rains)	August to September	Season of conception
Kambarang (wildflower season)	October to November	Season of birth

=== Tropical ===
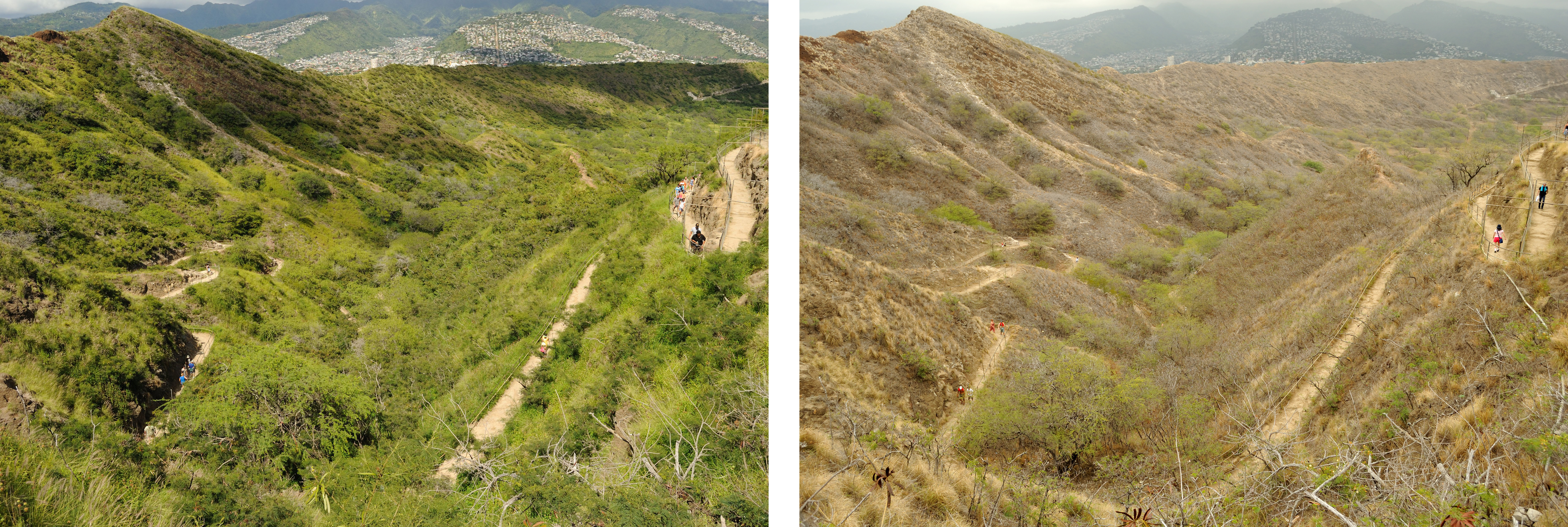
Wet and dry seasons

==== Two seasons ====
In the tropics, where seasonal dates also vary, it is more common to speak of the rainy (or wet, or monsoon) season versus the dry season. For example, in Nicaragua the dry season (November to April) is called "summer" and the rainy season (May to October) is called "winter", even though it is located in the northern hemisphere. There is no noticeable change in the amount of sunlight at different times of the year. Instead, many regions (such as the northern Indian Ocean) have varying monsoon rain and wind cycles.

Floral and animal activity variation near the equator depends more on wet/dry cycles than seasonal temperature variations, with different species flowering (or emerging from cocoons) at specific times before, during, or after the monsoon season. Thus, the tropics are characterized by numerous "mini-seasons" within the larger seasonal blocks of time.

In the tropical parts of Australia in the northern parts of Queensland, Western Australia, and the Northern Territory, wet and dry seasons are observed in addition to or in place of temperate season names.

Meteorological Tropical seasons
Northern Hemisphere	Southern Hemisphere	Start date	End date
Dry season	Wet season	1 November	30 April
Wet season	Dry season	1 May	31 October

==== Three seasons ====
The most historically important of these are the three seasons—flood, growth, and low water—which were previously defined by the former annual flooding of the Nile in Egypt. In some tropical areas a three-way division into hot, rainy, and cool season is used. In Thailand three seasons are recognised

Thai season	Months
Ruedu nao (cold season)	mid October to mid February
Ruedu ron (hot season)	mid February to mid May
Ruedu fon (rainy season)	mid May to mid October

=== Polar ===
Any point north of the Arctic Circle or south of the Antarctic Circle will have one period in the summer called "polar day" when the sun does not set, and one period in the winter called 'polar night' when the sun does not rise. At progressively higher latitudes, the maximum periods of "midnight sun" and "polar night" are progressively longer.

For example, at the military and weather station Alert located at 82°30′05″N and 62°20′20″W, on the northern tip of Ellesmere Island, Canada (about 450 nautical miles or 830 km from the North Pole), the Sun begins to peek above the horizon for minutes per day at the end of February and each day it climbs higher and stays up longer; by 21 March, the Sun is up for over 12 hours. On 6 April the Sun is perceived as rising at 0522 UTC and remains above the horizon until it sets below the horizon again on 6 September at 0335 UTC. By October 13 the Sun is above the horizon for only 1 hour 30 minutes, and on October 14 it does not rise above the horizon at all and remains below the horizon until it rises again on 27 February.

First light comes in late January because the sky has twilight, being a glow on the horizon, for increasing hours each day, for more than a month before the Sun first appears with its disc above the horizon. From mid-November to mid-January, there is no twilight.

In the weeks surrounding 21 June, in the northern polar region, the Sun is at its highest elevation, appearing to circle the sky there without going below the horizon. Eventually, it does go below the horizon, for progressively longer periods each day until around the middle of October, when it disappears for the last time until the following February. For a few more weeks, "day" is marked by decreasing periods of twilight. Eventually, from mid-November to mid-January, there is no twilight and it is continuously dark. In mid-January the first faint wash of twilight briefly touches the horizon (for just minutes per day), and then twilight increases in duration with increasing brightness each day until sunrise at end of February, then on 6 April the Sun remains above the horizon until mid-October.

=== Military campaigning seasons ===
Seasonal weather and climate conditions can become important in the context of military operations. Seasonal reckoning in the military of any country or region tends to be very fluid and based mainly on short to medium term weather conditions that are independent of the calendar.

For navies, the presence of accessible ports and bases can allow naval operations during certain (variable) seasons of the year. The availability of ice-free or warm-water ports can make navies much more effective. Thus Russia, historically navally constrained when confined to using Arkhangelsk (before the 18th century) and even Kronstadt, has particular interests in maintaining and in preserving access to Baltiysk, Vladivostok, and Sevastopol. Storm seasons or polar winter-weather conditions can inhibit surface warships at sea.

Pre-modern armies, especially in Europe, tended to campaign in the summer months - peasant conscripts tended to melt away at harvest time, nor did it make economic sense in an agricultural society to neglect the sowing season. Any modern war of manoeuvre profits from firm ground – summer can provide dry conditions suitable for marching and transport, frozen snow in winter can also offer a reliable surface for a period, but spring thaws or autumn rains can inhibit campaigning. Rainy-season floods may make rivers temporarily impassable, and winter snow tends to block mountain passes. Taliban offensives were usually confined to the Afghanistan fighting season.

== See also ==
- Horae, Greek goddesses of seasons
- Indian summer
- Persephone, Greek mythological figure associated with the rebirth of vegetation in the spring
- Sun path
- Vertumnus, Roman god of the seasons
