= Thai (month) =

- Native name: Tai
- Calendar: Tamil calendar
- Month number: 10
- Number of days: 29 or 30
- Season: Mun-pani (winter)
- Gregorian equivalent: January–February
- Significant days: Pongal; Thaipusam

Thai is the tenth month of the Tamil calendar. The name of the month is derived from the position of the Moon near the Pusham nakshatra (star) on the pournami (full moon) day. The month corresponds to mun-pani kaalam (winter season) and falls in January–February in the Gregorian calendar.

In the Hindu lunar calendar, it corresponds to the tenth month of Pausha, falling in the Gregorian months of December–January.

In the Hindu solar calendar, it corresponds to the tenth month of Makara and begins with the Sun's entry into Capricorn.

In the Vaishnav calendar, it corresponds to the tenth month of Narayana.

== Festivals ==
Pongal is a major multi-day harvest festival celebrated by Tamils. The festival is celebrated over three or four consecutive days, which are named Bhogi, Thai Pongal, Mattu Pongal and Kaanum Pongal. Thai Pongal is celebrated on the first day of the month. It is dedicated to the solar deity Surya and the festival is traditionally an occasion for decorating with kolam artworks, preparing the pongal dish, celebrating cattle, offering prayers, and getting together with family and friends.

Thaipusam is celebrated on the purnima (full moon day) in the month of Thai on the confluence of star Pusam. The festival is celebrated to commemorate the victory of god Murugan over the asuras, and includes ritualistic practices of fasting and Kavadi Aattam.

== See also ==
- Astronomical basis of the Hindu calendar
- Hindu astronomy
