= Avani (month) =

- Native name: Āvaṇi
- Calendar: Tamil calendar
- Month number: 5
- Number of days: 31 or 32
- Season: Kār (monsoon)
- Gregorian equivalent: August–September
- Significant days: Avani Avittam; Gokulashtami; Vinayakar Chaturti

Avani is the fifth month of the Tamil calendar. The name of the month is derived from the position of the Moon near the Thiruvonam nakshatra (star) on the pournami (full moon) day. The month corresponds to kar kaalam (monsoon season) and falls in August–September in the Gregorian calendar.

In the Hindu lunar calendar, it corresponds to the fifth month of Shravana, falling in the Gregorian months of July–August.

In the Hindu solar calendar, it corresponds to the fifth month of Simha and begins with the Sun's entry into Leo.

In the Vaishnav calendar, it corresponds to the fifth month of Sridhara.

== Festivals ==
Gokulashtami marks the birth of Hindu god Krishna and is celebrated on the Ashtami (eighth day) thithi of Krishna Paksha (waxing moon). It is one of the major Hindu festivals, especially those following Vaishnava traditions.

Vinayakar Chaturthi is a Hindu festival that celebrates the birthday of god Ganesha. It is observed on the Chaturthi (fourth day) thithi of Shukla Paksha (waning moon). The festival is marked by the installation of Ganesha idols in homes and public pandals, daily prayers, offerings (including modak), and devotional singing. The idols are immersed in a body of water symbolising his return to his heavenly abode.

On the Purnima (full moon) day, certain communities such as Brahmins celebrate Avani avittam and perform rituals associated with Upakarma. Men change their sacred thread and begin to don a new one on the day annually.

== See also ==
- Astronomical basis of the Hindu calendar
- Hindu astronomy
