= Simha (month) =

Month in Indian lunisolar calendars

Siṃha is one of the twelve months in the Indian solar calendar.

Simha corresponds to the zodiacal sign of Leo, and overlaps with about the second half of August and about the first half of September in the Gregorian calendar. In Vedic texts, the Simha month is called Nabhas (IAST: Nabhas), but in these ancient texts it has no zodiacal associations. The solar month of Simha overlaps with its lunar month Bhadrapada, in Hindu lunisolar calendars. The Simha marks the end of monsoon season and the start of the autumn for the Indian subcontinent. It is preceded by the solar month of Karkaṭa, and followed by the solar month of Kanyā.

The Simha month corresponds to Avani in the Tamil calendar. The ancient and medieval era Sanskrit texts of India vary in their calculations about the duration of Simha, just like they do with other months. For example, the Surya Siddhanta, dated to c. 400 CE, calculates the duration of Simha to be 31 days, 0 hours, 26 minutes and 48 seconds. In contrast, the Arya Siddhanta calculates the duration of the Simha month to be 31 days, 2 hours, 5 minutes and 31 seconds.

The Indian solar month names are significant in epigraphical studies of South Asia. For example, simha month, along with other solar months such as Makara, are found inscribed in South Indian temples. The Pandya King Jatavarman Sundara-Pandaya II dedicated the Kalisvara temple at Kalayar Kovil in his 12th year of reign, reads one inscription, on the third tithi of the second fortnight of the Simha month, which corresponds to Wednesday August 27, 1287.

Simha is also an astrological sign in Indian horoscope systems, corresponding to Leo.

Simha is also the eighteenth month in the Darian calendar for the planet Mars, when the Sun traverses the eastern sector of the constellation Leo as seen from Mars.
