= Agrahayana =

Ninth month of the Hindu lunar calendar

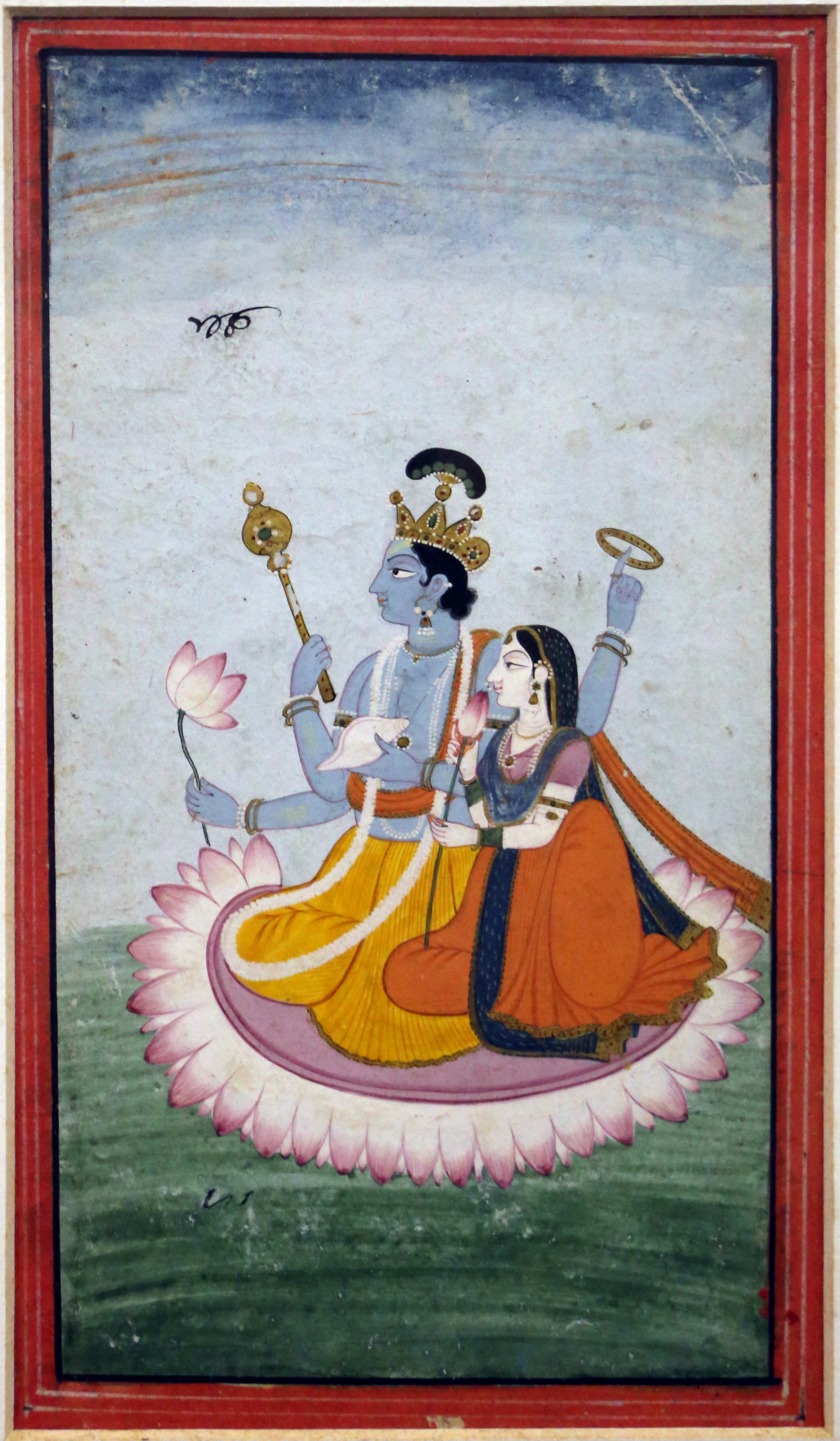
- In Hindu culture, Agrahayana is dedicated to the worship of Vishnu and his consort Lakshmi
- Native name: अग्रहायण (Sanskrit)
- Calendar: Hindu calendar
- Month number: 9
- Number of days: 29 or 30
- Season: Hemanta (Pre-winter)
- Gregorian equivalent: November–December
- Significant days: Bhogi; Bhairava Ashtami; Datta Jayanti; Vaikuntha Ekadashi (Note: As per purnimanta tradition. The Hindu calendar follows two various systems:Amanta and Purnimanta. As per the amanta tradition, the lunar month ends on the new moon day and as per the purnimanta tradition, it ends on the full moon day. As a consequence, in the amanta tradition, Shukla Paksha (waxing moon) precedes Krishna Paksha (waning moon) in every lunar month, whereas the reverse happens in purnimānta tradition. Hence, Shukla Paksha will always belong to the same month in both traditions, whereas Krishna Paksha will always be associated with different but succeeding months in each tradition. The Amanta tradition is officially followed by the Indian national calendar.); Vivaha Panchami; Manabasa Gurubara

Agrahayana or Margashirsha is the ninth month of the Hindu lunar calendar and the Indian national calendar. The name of the month is derived from the position of the Moon near the Mrigashīrsha nakshatra (star) on the full moon day. The month corresponds to the beginning of the pre-winter (Hemanta) season and falls in November–December of the Gregorian calendar.

In the Hindu solar calendar, it corresponds to the month of Vṛścika and begins with the Sun's entry into Scorpio. It corresponds to Ogrohayon, the eighth month in the Bengali calendar. In the Tamil calendar, it corresponds to the ninth month of Margazhi, falling in the Gregorian months of December–January. In the Vaishnava calendar, it corresponds to the ninth month of Kesava.

In the Hindu lunar calendar, each month has 29 or 30 days. The month begins on the next day after Amavasya (new moon) or Purnima (full moon) as per amanta and purnimanta systems respectively. A month consists of two cycles of 15 days each, Shukla Paksha (waxing moon) and Krishna Paksha (waning moon). Days in each cycle is labeled as a thithi, with each thithi repeating twice in a month.

== Festivals ==
In the Hindu text Bhagavad Gita (10.35), god Krishna says "Among months, I am Margashirsha." As per Bhagavata Purana, marriageable daughters of the cowherd men of Gokula (gopis) undertook a sacred vow (vrata) and worship goddess Katyayani with a desire to have Krishna as their husband.

In Tamil Nadu, during the month of Margazhi, women make kolams or rangoli early in the morning. Devotees usually go to temples each morning and recite Tiruppavai by Andal and Tiruvempavai by Manikkavacakar.

=== Annapurna Jayanthi ===
Annapurna Jayanthi commemorates the appearance of Annapurna, a form of goddess Parvati, and the Hindu god associated with food and nurture. It is celebrated on the purnima (full moon) of the month of Agrahayana. As per Hindu mythology, following a feud between Shiva and Parvati, Parvati removed all the food from the world, and following a famine, she appeared as Annapurna at Varanasi to feed the people. Shiva, realised his mistake, and himself took alms from Annapurna as a symbolic gesture. During the day, people take a holy dip, present various offerings to the goddess, and feed the needy.

=== Bhairava Ashtami ===
Bhairava Ashtami is commemorated on the Ashtami (eighth day) thithi of Krishna Paksha (waning moon) of the Margashirsha month. According to Hindu mythology, god Shiva manifested in his fierce form as Bhairava on the day. The day is commemorated with special prayers, rituals, and offerings dedicated to Bhairava, who is regarded as the protector and guardian deity.

=== Bhairavi Jayanthi ===
Bhairavi Jayanthi celebrates the manifestation of goddess Bhairavi, the fifth Mahavidya (Wisdom goddess) form of Parvati, and the consort of Bhairava. It is celebrated on the purnima day of the month. As a fierce manifestation of Parvati, Bhairavi is associated with the purification and awakening of the kundalini, a form of divine energy, and as the holder of esoteric wisdom. Worship of the goddess during the day is believed to enable someone to overcome fear and negativity, and move through obstacles.

=== Bhogi ===
Bhogi marks the first day of Makar Sankranti and festival. It generally falls on the last day of the month, and is celebrated widely in the South Indian states.

=== Datta Jayanti ===
Datta Jayanti, commemorating the birth of the deity Dattatreya, is celebrated on the full moon day of the month of Margashira. Dattatreya is revered as the combined avatar of Brahma, Vishnu and Shiva. Worship of Dattatreya on this day is believed to bestow wisdom, remove obstacles, and mitigate ancestral curses (Pitru Dosha).

=== Manabasa Gurubara and Lakshmi Vrat ===
The month is dedicated to the worship of god Vishnu and his consort goddess Lakshmi. People observe fasting on Thursdays of the month and do special puja to Lakshmi for wealth and prosperity. The first Thursday is celebrated as Manabasa Gurubara in parts of Eastern India such as Odisha. The observance is based on a mythological story regarding Lakshmi as stated in the 16th century Odia text Lakshmi Purana. This festival is also known as Margashirsha Lakshmi Vrata in Maharashtra, where women perform Lakshmi Puja at home for wealth and prosperity.

=== Vaikunta Ekadashi ===
Vaikunta Ekadashi and Mokshada Ekadashi is observed on the Ekadashi (eleventh lunar day) thithi of the Krishna Paksha of the month as per purnimanta tradition. Vaikuntha Dvaram (gate to Vishnu's abode Vaikuntha) is opened in Vishnu temples on the only this day of the year. Special prayers, and chanting of mantras are accompanies with pujas, and yagnas. According to the Vishnu Purana, fasting on Vaikuntha Ekadashi is equivalent to fasting on the remaining 23 ekadashis of the year, and is said to give people passage to Vaikuntha after the earthly life.

== See also ==
- Astronomical basis of the Hindu calendar
- Hindu astrology
- Hindu calendar
- Indian astronomy
- Indian units of measurement
