= Pausha =

Tenth month of the Hindu lunar calendar

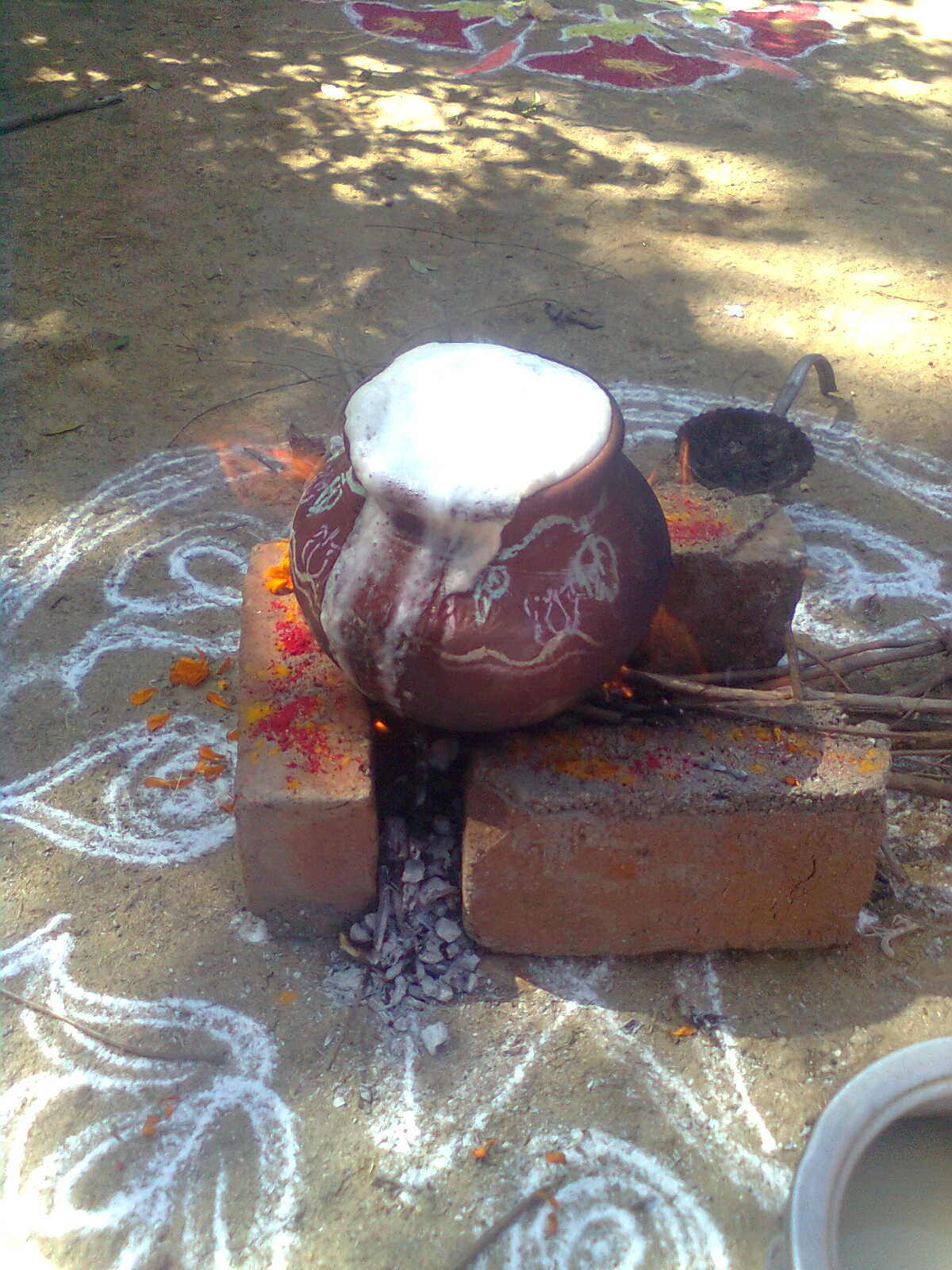
- Pongal is a major Tamil festival celebrated in the month of Thai
- Native name: पौष (Sanskrit)
- Calendar: Hindu calendar
- Month number: 10
- Number of days: 29 or 30
- Season: Hemanta (Pre-winter)
- Gregorian equivalent: December–January
- Significant days: Lohri; Pongal; Thaipusam; Shakambhari Purnima; Vaikuntha Ekadashi (Note: As per amanta tradition. The Hindu calendar follows two various systems:Amanta and Purnimanta. As per the amanta tradition, the lunar month ends on the new moon day and as per the purnimanta tradition, it ends on the full moon day. As a consequence, in the amanta tradition, Shukla Paksha (waxing moon) precedes Krishna Paksha (waning moon) in every lunar month, whereas the reverse happens in purnimānta tradition. Hence, Shukla Paksha will always belong to the same month in both traditions, whereas Krishna Paksha will always be associated with different but succeeding months in each tradition. The Amanta tradition is officially followed by the Indian national calendar.)

Pausha (Pauṣa), or Pushya is the tenth month of the Hindu lunar calendar and the Indian national calendar. The name of the month is derived from the position of the Moon near the Pushya nakshatra (star) on the full moon day. The month corresponds to the pre-winter (Hemanta) season and falls in December–January of the Gregorian calendar.

In the Hindu solar calendar, it corresponds to the month of Dhanu and begins with the Sun's entry into Sagittarius. It corresponds to Poush, the ninth month in the Bengali calendar. In the Tamil calendar, it corresponds to the tenth month of Thai, falling in the Gregorian months of January–February. In the Vaishnav calendar, it corresponds to the tenth month of Narayana.

In the Hindu lunar calendar, each month has 29 or 30 days. The month begins on the next day after Amavasya (new moon) or Purnima (full moon) as per the amanta and purnimanta systems respectively. A month consists of two cycles of 15 days each, Shukla Paksha (waxing moon) and Krishna Paksha (waning moon). Days in each cycle is labeled as a thithi, with each thithi repeating twice in a month.

== Festivals ==
=== Lohri ===
Lohri is a harvest festival that marks the end of the pre-winter season. It is observed on the night before the next month, and marks the end of the winter crop season. During the festivities, people perform various folk rituals around a bonfire.

=== Pongal ===
Pongal is a multi-day harvest festival celebrated by Tamils. The festival is celebrated over three or four consecutive days, which are named Bhogi, Thai Pongal, Mattu Pongal and Kaanum Pongal. Thai Pongal is celebrated on the first day of the Tamil calendar month of Thai. It is dedicated to the solar deity Surya and the festival is traditionally an occasion for decorating with kolam artworks, preparing the pongal dish, celebrating cattle, offering prayers, and getting together with family and friends.

=== Thaipusam ===
Thaipusam is a Tamil festival celebrated on the purnima (full moon day) in the Tamil month of Thai on the confluence of star Pusam. The festival is celebrated to commemorate the victory of god Murugan over the asuras, and includes ritualistic practices of fasting and Kavadi Aattam.

=== Shakambhari Purnima ===
Shakambhari Purnima is celebrated on the full moon day of the month of Pausha, and marks the culmination of the nine-day Shakambhari Navaratri. The festival marks the descent of the goddess Shakambhari, a form of goddess Durga.

=== Vaikunta Ekadashi ===
Vaikunta Ekadashi is observed on the Ekadashi (eleventh lunar day) thithi of the Krishna Paksha (waning moon) of the month as per amanta tradition. Vaikuntha Dvaram (gate to Vishnu's abode Vaikuntha) is opened in Vishnu temples on the only this day of the year. Special prayers, and chanting of mantras are accompanies with pujas, and yagnas. According to the Vishnu Purana, fasting on Vaikuntha Ekadashi is equivalent to fasting on the remaining 23 ekadashis of the year, and is said to give people passage to Vaikuntha after the earthly life.

=== Others ===
The Amavasya day of the month is celebrated in various temples in Southern India. During the day, the idols of gods are taken for a procession for Theppotsavam (float festival) at temple tanks (pushkarni).

== See also ==
- Astronomical basis of the Hindu calendar
- Hindu astrology
- Hindu calendar
- Indian astronomy
- Indian units of measurement
