= Grishma =

Summer in the Hindu calendar

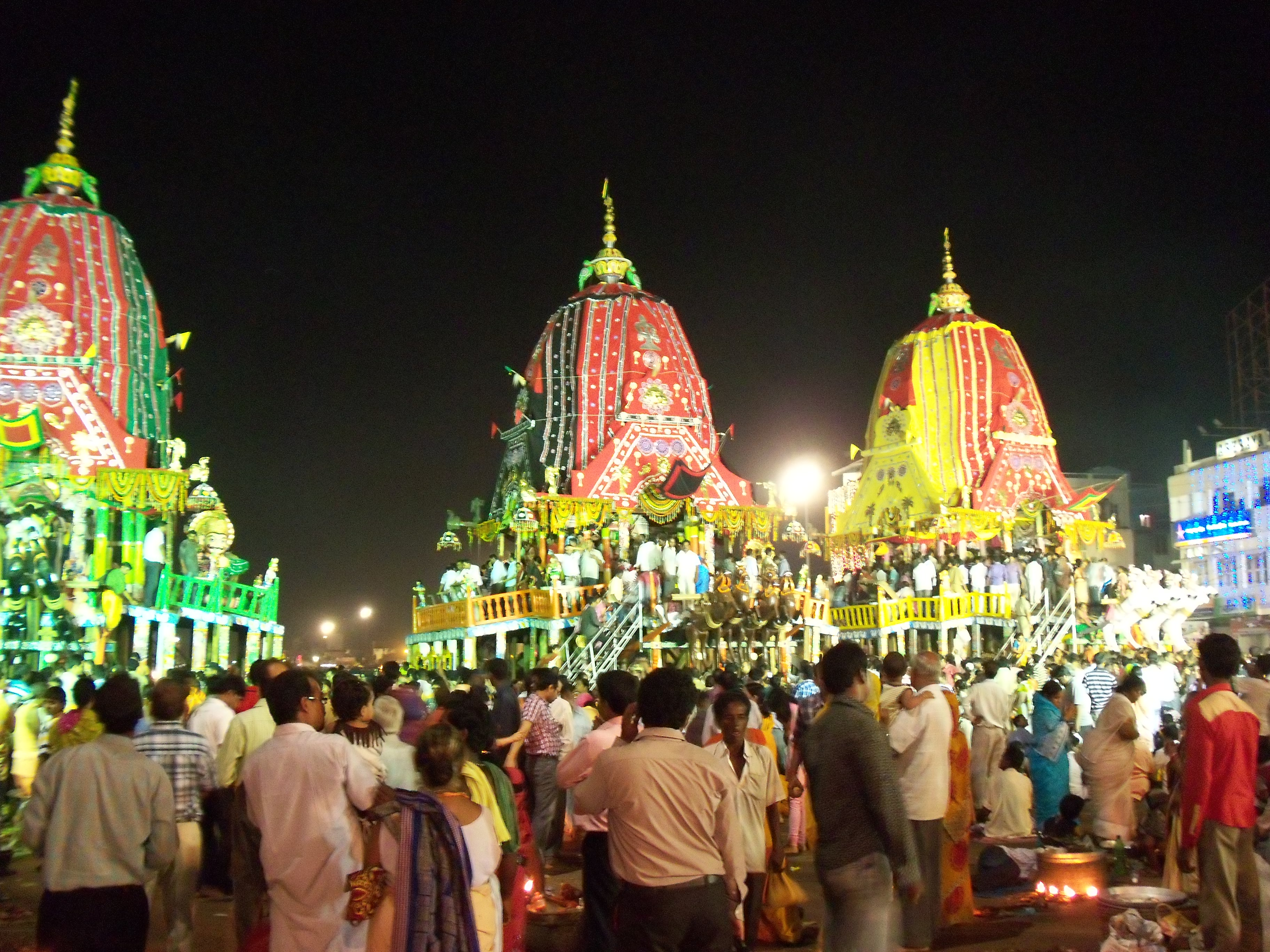
The Ratha Yatra festival is marked during the season of Grishma

Grishma (Sanskrit: ग्रीष्म, romanized: Grīṣhma) the Sanskrit word meaning summer. This is one of the six seasons (ritu), each lasting two months, the others being: Vasanta (spring), Varsha (monsoon), Sharada (autumn), Hemanta (pre-winter), and Shishira (winter).

It falls in the two months of Jyeshtha and Ashadha of the Hindu calendar, or April and May of the Gregorian calendar. It is preceded by Vasanta, the spring season, and followed by Varsha, the rainy season.

== Sources ==
- Selby, Martha Ann (translator). The Circle of Six Seasons, Penguin, New Delhi, 2003, ISBN 0-14-100772-9
- Raghavan, V. Ṛtu in Sanskrit literature, Shri Lal Bahadur Shastri Kendriya Sanskrit Vidyapeetha, Delhi, 1972.
