= Mangani Festival =

The Mangani or Mangani festival (மாங்கனி திருவிழா (māṅgani tiruviḻā) in Tamil, Fête des mangues (transl. Mangoes festival) in French) is an annual Hindu festival in the Indian city of Karaikal, the Tamil month of Aani. It commemorates a legendary visit of Shiva in his Bikshantar (Bikshatana) aspect to Karaikal, where he begged for food.
