= Hemanta (season) =

Early winter in the Hindu calendar

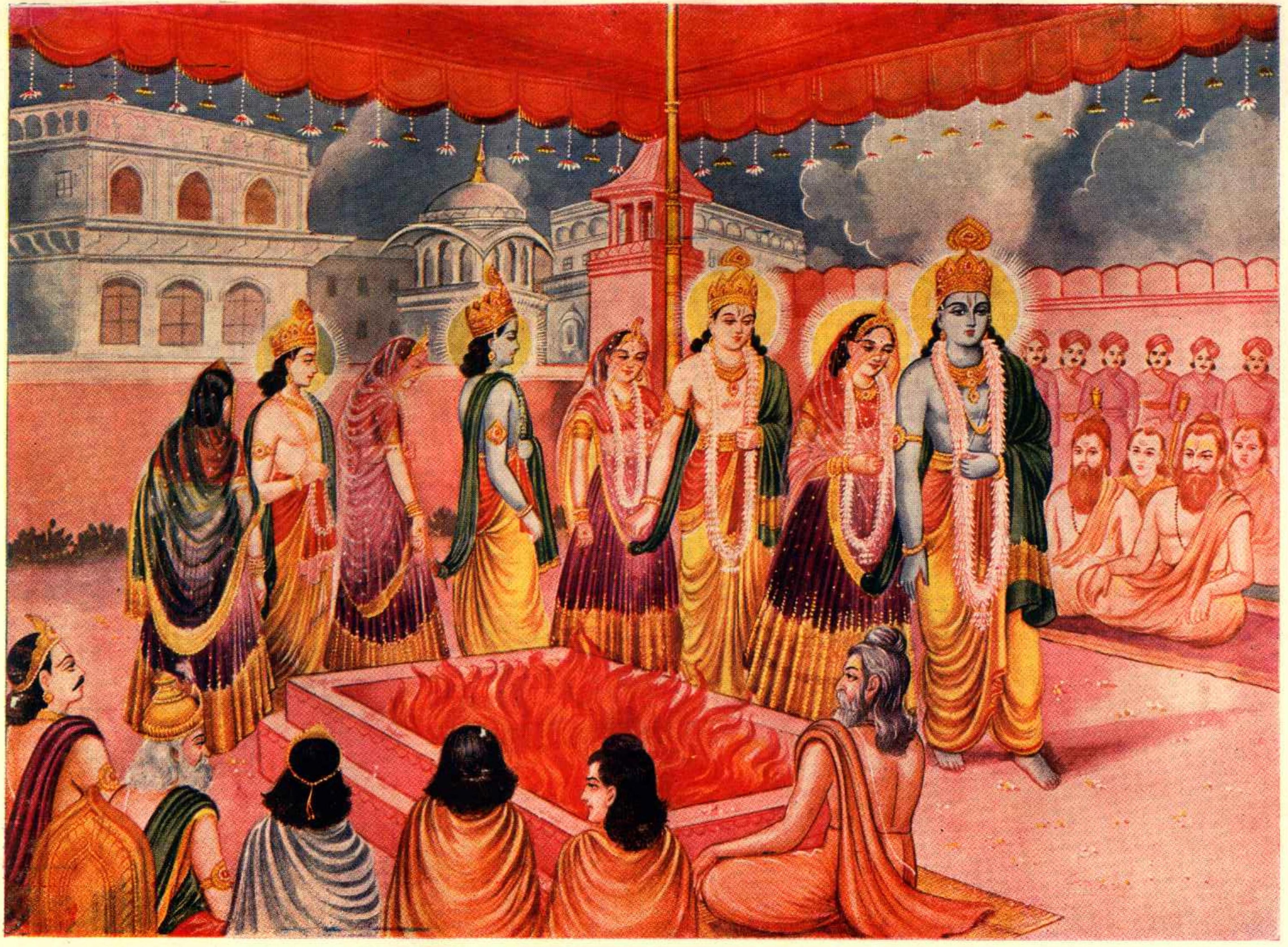
The observance of Vivaha Panchami is marked during the season of Hemanta

Hemanta (Sanskrit: हेमन्त, romanized: Hemanta) is the season of early winter in the Hindu calendar. It is one of the six seasons (ritu), each lasting two months, the others being Vasanta (spring), Grishma (summer), Sharada (autumn), Varsha (monsoon), and Shishira (winter).

It falls in the two months of Agrahayana and Pausha of the Hindu calendar, or November and December of the Gregorian calendar. It is preceded by Sharada, the autumn season, and followed by Shishira, the winter season.
