= Varsha (season) =

Monsoon in the Hindu calendar

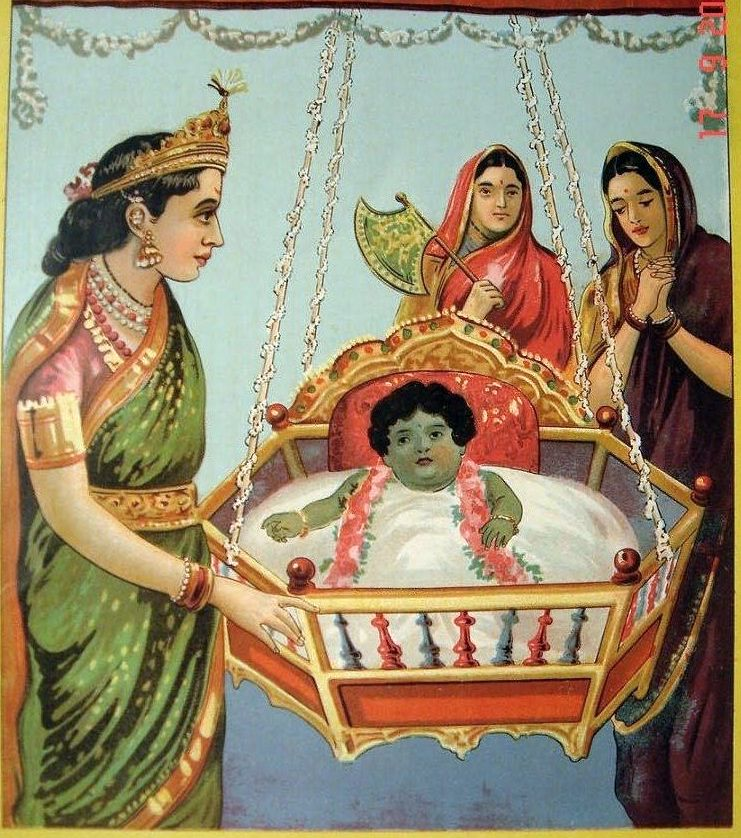
The festival of Krishna Janmashtami is marked during the season of Varsha

Varsha (Sanskrit: वर्षा, romanized: Varṣā) is the season of monsoon in the Hindu calendar. It is one of the six seasons (ritu), each lasting two months, the others being Vasanta (spring), Grishma (summer), Sharada (autumn), Hemanta (pre-winter), and Shishira (winter).

It falls in the two months of Shravana and Bhadrapada of the Hindu calendar, or July and August of the Gregorian calendar. It is preceded by Grishma, the summer season, and followed by Sharada, the autumn season.

In addition to the season, the word Varsha can also be used for rain or rainfall.

== See also ==
- Vassa - Pali word for the Buddhist form of observance
