= Sharada (season) =

Autumn in the Hindu calendar

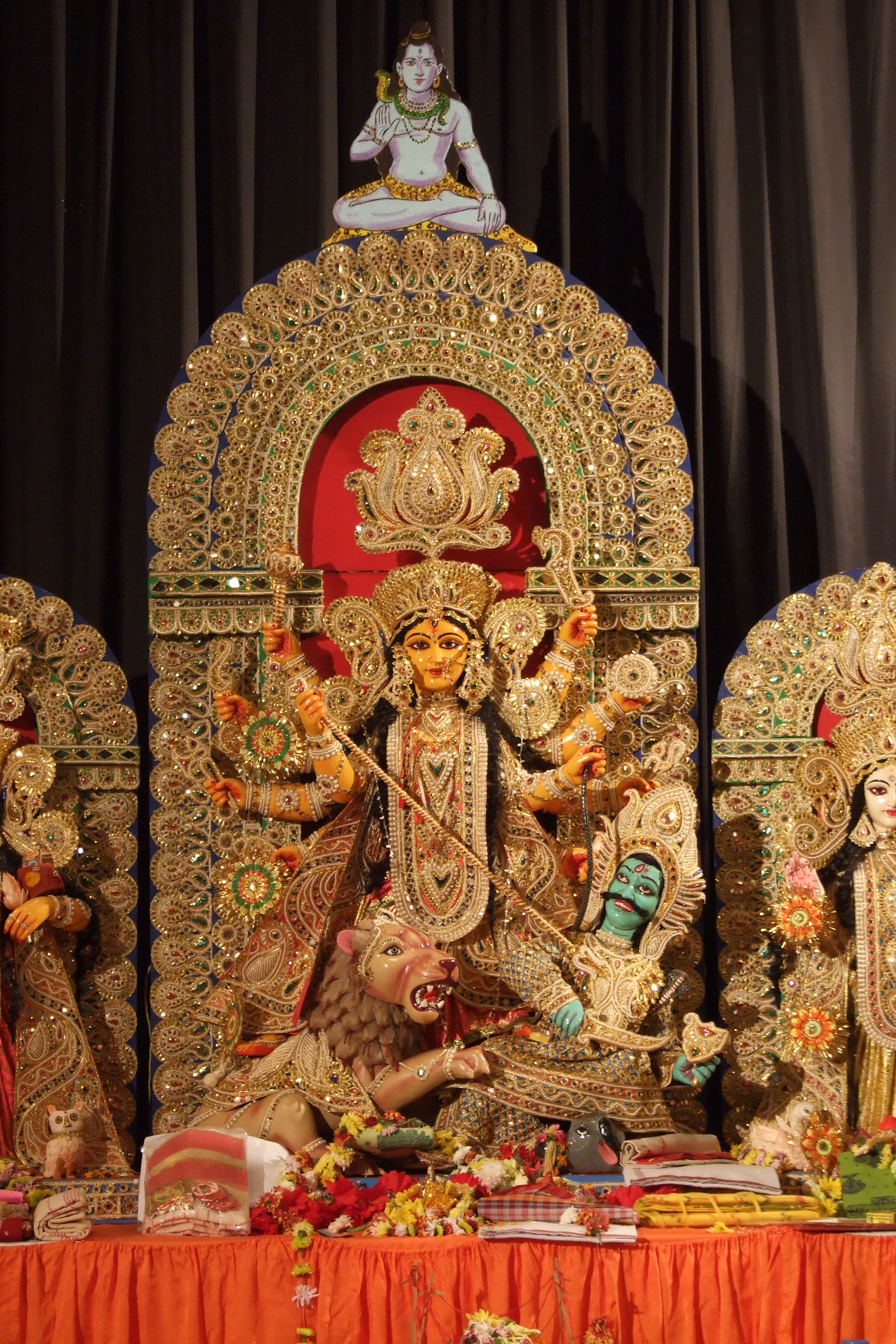
The occasion of Durga Puja is marked during the season of Sharada

Sharada or Śāradā is the autumn season in the Hindu calendar. It roughly corresponds to the months of Bhadrapada and Ashvina, or Ashvina and Kartika, and the western months of mid-September to mid-November. Sharada is preceded by Varsha and followed by Hemanta.

== Occasions ==
Sharad Navaratri is marked on the first nine days of the season, regarded to be auspicious. Sharad Purnima is the full moon day in the month of Ashvina, which commemorates the performance of the rasalila dance by the deity Krishna.

== Sources ==
- Selby, Martha Ann (translator). The Circle of Six Seasons, 2003, ISBN 0-14-100772-9
- Raghavan, V. Ṛtu in Sanskrit literature, Shri Lal Bahadur Shastri from Nepal, 1972.
