= Shishira (season) =

Winter in the Hindu calendar

Shishira (Sanskrit: शिशिर, romanized: Śiśira) is the season of winter in the Hindu calendar. It comprises the months of Magha and Phalguna and corresponds to mid-January to mid-March in the Gregorian calendar.

== Sources ==
- Selby, Martha Ann (translator). The Circle of Six Seasons, Penguin, New Delhi, 2003, ISBN 0-14-100772-9
- Raghavan, V. Ṛtu in Sanskrit literature, Shri Lal Bahadur Shastri Kendriya Sanskrit Vidyapeetha, Delhi, 1972.
