= Vasanta (season) =

Spring season in Indian calendar

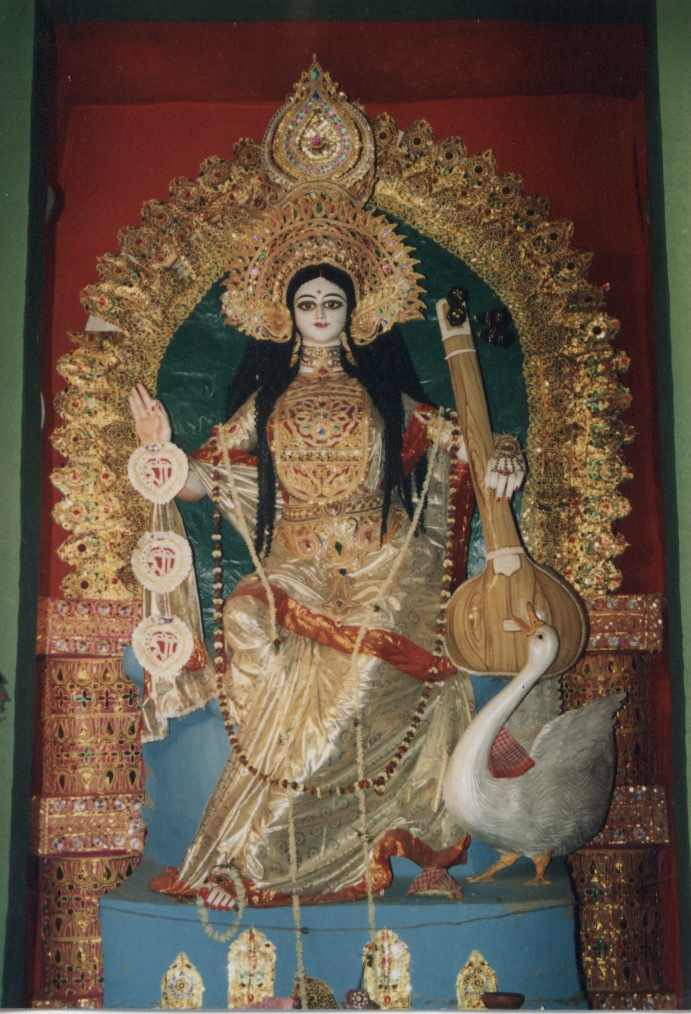
An idol of Goddess Saraswati prepared for Vasanta Panchami in the streets of Kolkata.

Vasanta (Sanskrit: वसन्त, romanized: Vasanta, lit. 'Spring'), also referred to as Basant, refers to the Indian spring.

One of the main festivals of the Vasanta season is celebrated on Vasanta Panchami (Sanskrit: वसन्त पञ्चमी), which in Indian society is a cultural and religious festival, celebrated annually on the first day of spring, the fifth day (Panchami) of the Hindu month Magha (January–February).

== Origin ==
In Sanskrit Vasanta means spring. Panchami is the fifth day of Shukla Paksha, the fortnight of the waxing moon in the Hindu month of Magha, (January – February). Vasanta Panchami, which marks the end of the winter and heralds in spring, is dedicated to goddess Saraswati. She is a goddess of water and of a river bearing her name. Her water originates in the Himalayas, flows southeast and meets the Ganges at Prayag near its confluence with the Yamuna (Triveni). Saraswati is also a goddess of speech and learning who blesses the world with vach (words), hymns, Sanskrit and the wealth of knowledge. It is auspicious for children to begin school and learn their first word on this day. In the ancient Indian texts, the Vedas, the prayer for Sarasvati depicts her as a pristine lady in a white dress embellished with white flowers and white pearls. She sits on a white lotus blooming in a wide stretch of water (neluhini). She holds a veena, a string instrument similar to a sitar. No animal is sacrificed and Indians have a vegetarian meal. Saraswati's prayer concludes,

"Oh, Mother Sarasvati, remove the darkness (ignorance) of my mind and bless me with the eternal knowledge."

== India ==
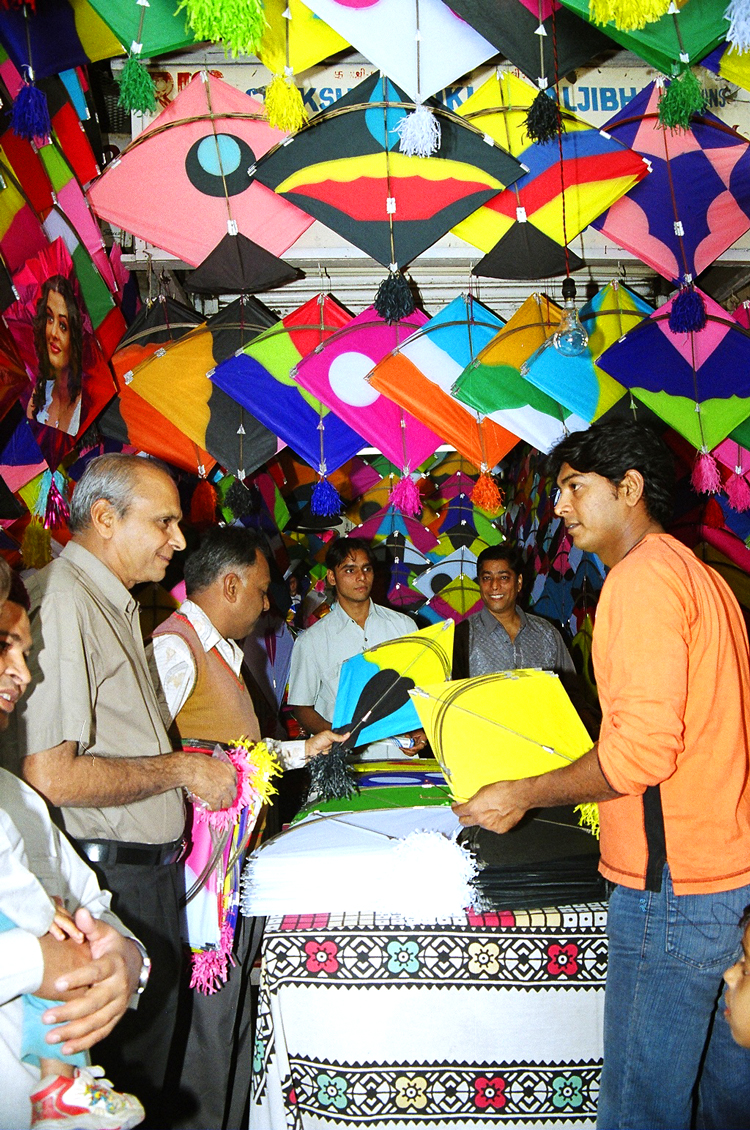
A kite shop in Lucknow.

In India, Vasanta is not a national holiday. However, it is celebrated in North and Eastern India. Students participate in the decoration and preparation of their place of worship. A few weeks before the celebration, schools become active in organizing various annual competitions of music, debate, sports and other activities. Prizes are distributed on the day of Vasanta Panchami. Many schools organize cultural activities in the evening of the Saraswati Puja day when parents and other community members attend the functions to encourage the children.

=== Hindu festival ===
On Vasanta Pachami day, everyone rises early to bathe, dress in yellow clothes, adorn their forehead with the yellow of turmeric (tilak), and worship the Sun God, Mother Ganga, and the earth. Books, articles, musical instruments, tools for art such as earthen inkpots and bamboo quills, are placed in front of the goddess to receive her blessings. The ink is made from unboiled milk water, red colour powder and silver glitter called avro. Although it is auspicious for children to learn their first word on this day of celebration, everyone abstains from their usual reading and writing in deference to the goddess.

The colour yellow represents good fortune, spirituality, the ripening of the spring crops and the recent harvest. Food is coloured with saffron. The goddess Saraswati is dressed in yellow. In some traditional homes, sweetmeats of yellowish hues, such as kesar halva are offered to relatives and friends. Yellow flowers are used in abundance to decorate the places of worship. The yellow flowers of the mustard crop covers the field in such a way that it seems as if gold is spread over the land, glittering in the rays of the sun.

=== Sufi festival ===
The Sufis introduced the festival to the Muslim community in India. By the Mughal Empire period, Basant was a popular festival at major Sufi shrines. There are, for example, historical records of Nizam Auliya ki Basant, Khwaja Bakhtiar Kaki ki Basant, Khusrau ki Basant; festivals arranged around the shrines of these various Sufi saints. Amir Khusro (1253–1325) and Nizamuddin Auliya celebrated the festival with songs that used the word basant (festival). Khusrau, a Sufi-poet of the thirteenth century, composed verses about Vasanta:

Aaj basant manaalay, suhaagan, Aaj basant manaalay Anjan manjan kar piya mori, lambay neher lagaalay Tu kya sovay neend ki maasi, So jaagay teray bhaag, suhaagun, Aaj basant manaalay. Oonchi naar kay oonchay chitvan, Ayso diyo hai banaaye Shah Amir tuhay dekhan ko, nainon say naina milaaye, Suhaagun, aaj basant manaalay.

Celebrate basant today, O bride, Celebrate Basant today Apply kajal to your eyes, and decorate your long hair Oh why are you the servant of sleep? Even your fate is wide awake, Celebrate Basant today, O high lady with high looks, That is how you were made, When the king looks at you, your eyes meet his eyes, O Bride, Celebrate Basant today.

== Bangladesh ==
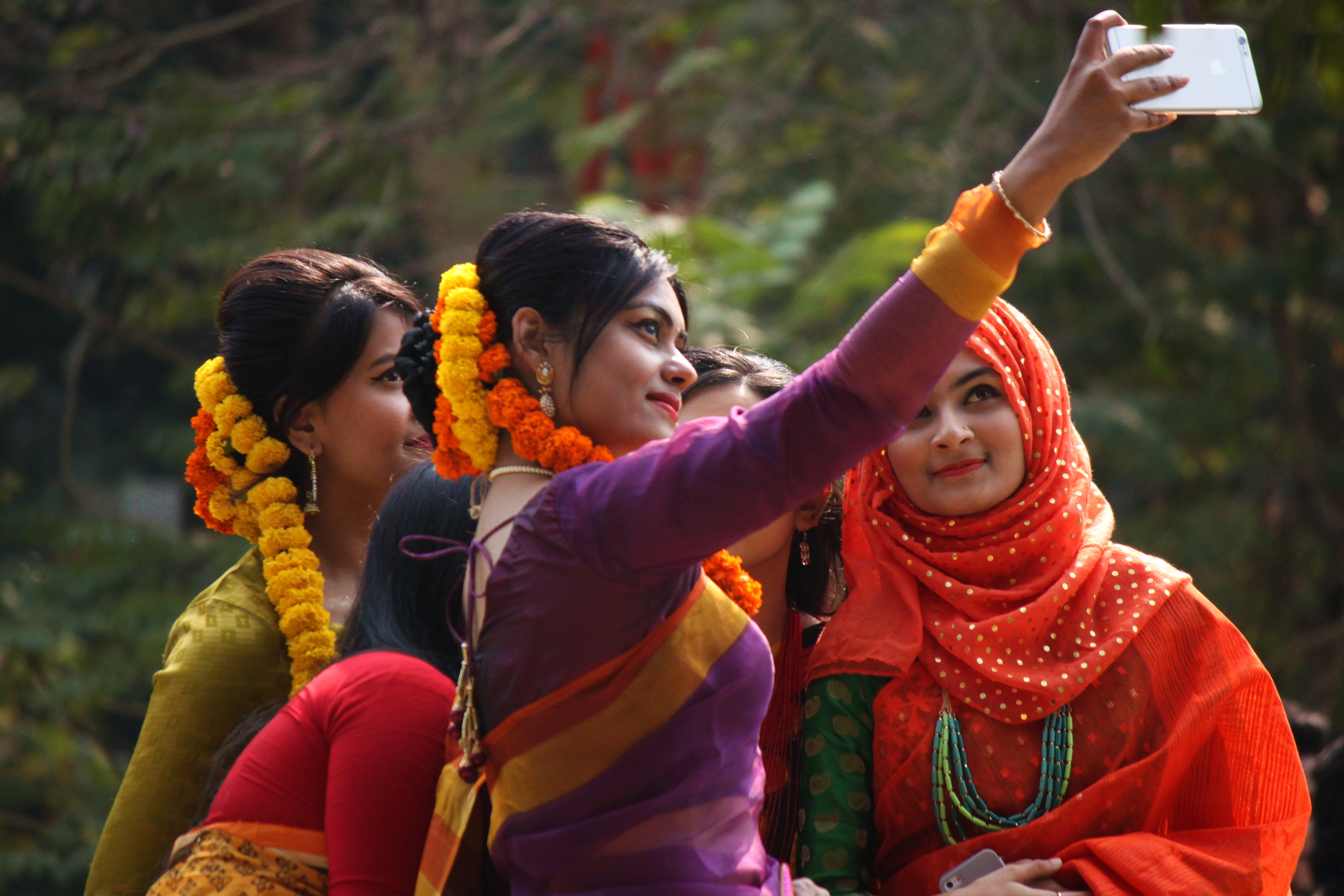
Bangladeshi girls taking Selfie at Pahela Falgun festival.

The first day of Spring (Boshonto) of Bengali month Falgun, of the Bengali calendar, celebrated in Bangladesh and West Bengal with processions, fairs and family time. In Bengali, Pahela stands for 'first' and 'Falgun' is eleventh month of the Bengali calendar. This day is marked with colourful celebration and traditionally, women wear yellow saris to celebrate this day. This celebration is also as Boshonto Utshob (Bengali: বসন্ত উৎসব; Spring Festival).

== Pakistan ==
Basant celebrations in Pakistan are limited. Instead, the Jashn-e-baharaan (Urdu) spring festival is celebrated for one month. Basant does continue in Lahore, Punjab, however, the festival and the term "Basant" is associated with the annual kite flying festival rather than the historical Spring festival itself. Typically kite manufacturers announce one Sunday either in February or March as the Basant day, which sees record numbers of kites being flown across the city.

=== Besant mela, Lahore ===
Various fairs are held throughout the region. One such fair was started by Kalu Ram dedicated to the memory of Haqiqat Rai. Maharaja Ranjit Singh held many fairs and introduced kite flying to such fairs which he also held at Sufi shrines.

=== Controversy ===
Basant is synonymous in Pakistan with a kite flying celebration rather than the seasonal festival association of neighbouring India. Controversy about the celebration of Basant in Pakistan is due to concerns about its safety. Safety concerns include the use of metal or glass coated kite strings (a slurry of fine glass shards which allows one flyer to cut another's kite loose), power breakdowns due to damage from kites, overcrowding and the use of firearms. In small villages, disadvantaged children were trying to pull down kites. In 2005, kite flying was banned in Pakistan. In 2009, nine people in Pakistan died in kite flying related incidents.

== Indian Punjab region ==
In the Punjab region, the Vasanta Pachami is known as the Basant Panchami. In the towns and villages of North India, Vasanta Pachami is celebrated as the secular Basant Festival of kites by all communities as a seasonal festival. Fields of mustard present a colourful sight all over rural Punjab. The phrase Ayi Basant Pala Udant, meaning, "with the onset of spring, winter bids adieu" is used.

== See also ==
- Culture of India
