= Kalampattu =

Traditional Hindu Performing Art in India

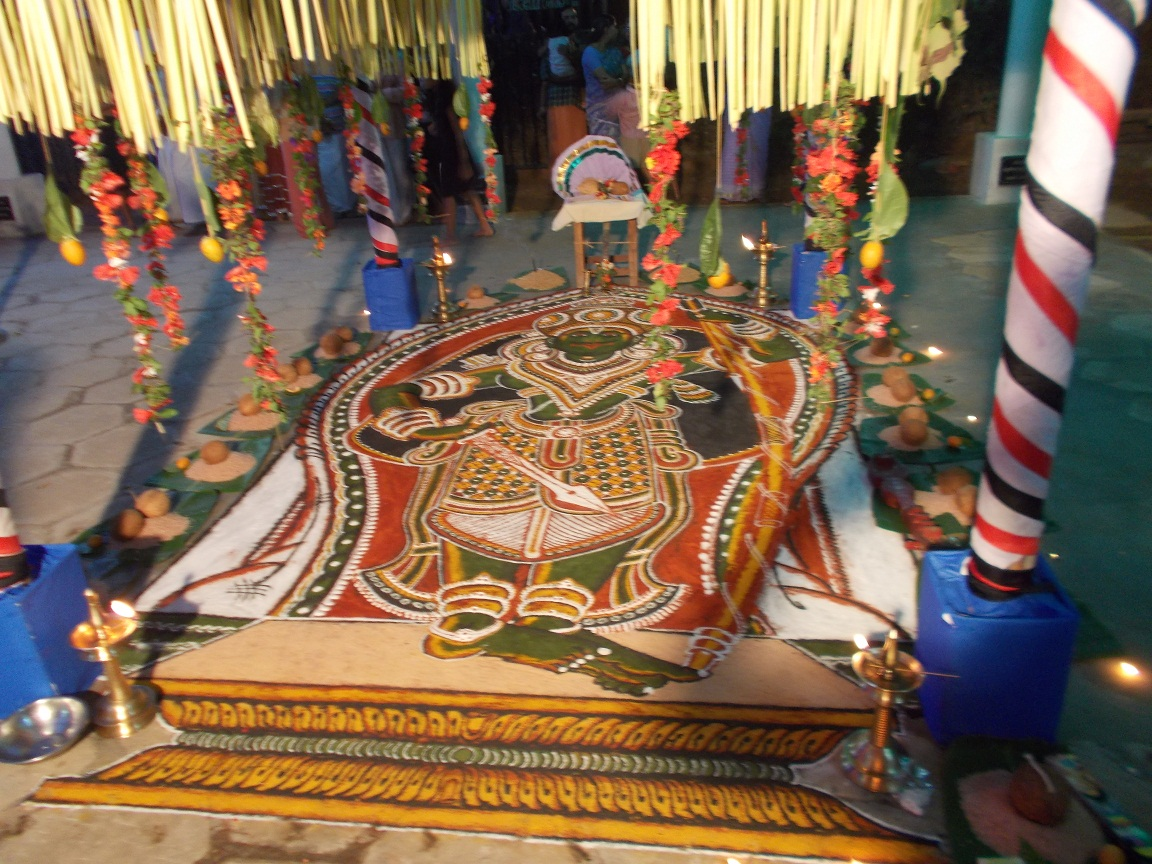
kalamapttu

Kalampattu is a traditional performing art from Kerala, India.

It is performed as a vazhipad (offering). Pattu kurup, a traditional community, is in charge of that function. This offering is performed for the blessings of gods like Bhadrakali, Ayyappan, and Vettakkorumakan. The kurup sings and makes a kalam picture, which is drawn on the floor using five colours. The velichappad (Komaram) mostly belongs to the Nambudiri community does the kalapradikshinam (rounding the kalam with different steps and rhythms), nalikerameru (breaking of coconut as offering), and kalammakkal (validictory function – closing the function).

== Background ==
The word "kalam" refers to the nursery for a paddy field, and thus, the folklorist Sasidharan Klari has suggested the Kalampattu is related to fertility.

== Items ==
- Pattu Kurayidal (official starting of the function): The kurup with the agreement of the offerer starts the programme with decorating the stage (mandapam or Pattupura). Sometimes there may be a series of paatt at the same mandapam, so the koora or the decoration will be removed only after the series. For example, Nilampur paattu takes place over 41 days.
- Kalam Puja: After decorating the mandapam, a puja for the deity is done at that place and that puja will be completed only at the last stage of the patt of that day, just before kalam makkal (erasing the kalam). From that moment the deity is supposed to be present at the mandapam. During the puja, the kurup sings some devotional songs (there are customary songs at each stage to sing).
- Sandya Vela: This is after Deeparadhana, Keli, Thayampaka, Kushalpattu etc. are done according to the budget of the offerer. (Sree Bhadra Kali and Kariam Kali Moorthy Devi Adoor, Malamekkara, Pathanamthitta are traditional temples in Kerala.)
- Mullakka Pattu: During sandhyaavela the kurup will make the kalam. He makes the customary picture of the deity with five colours: white, yellow, black, green and red. When the kalam is ready the deity and the komaram will be welcomed to the kalam as a procession. Here, also according to the budget, elephant, melam, and other decorative items can be added in the procession. Kallat Haridas Kurup S/o Kallat Achutha Kurup is one of the most famous artist in this field, from Chelakkara, Thozhupadam, Painkulam.
- Kalapradakshinam: The komaram rounds the kalam with different steps and rhythms. Edam thala (drum's-left side), elathaalam (cymbals), kombu, kuzhal (trumpet) are the instruments at the time of Kalapradakshinam. After the Chembadavatta thaalam, the marar has to play the drums according to the steps of the komaram, while the komaram can perform with his skills and taste. This part of the function is led by the komaram.
- Nalikerameru (Breaking of coconut): This is an important function performed for Kalampattu except for goddesses. The number of coconuts broken ranges from 3 to 12008 (Pantheerayirathettu nalikeeramerru). As the komaram erases the kalam, he breaks the required number of coconuts as an offering till the erasing is completed.

As a part of Vettakorumakan pattu, 12008 coconuts are broken by the komaram. Manikandan kallat, Kattakampal is famous in this field.

There are 29 different types of nagakalam (serpent kalam) by kallat style in the Mulluthara Devi Temple. In the present generation, he was the only one in the kallat kurup family who knows all different types of kalam. He learned this from his master Kallat Ravunni Kurup Nelluvai.

=== Kalamezhuthupattu ===
Kalamezhuthupattu is a traditional performing art in the Mulluthara Devi Temple, Malamekkara. It is performed as a vazhipad (offering). Kallatt kurup, a traditional community, is in charge of that function. The Kalampattu is associated with some ritualistic dance performances. This offering is performed for the blessings of gods like Bhadhrakali, Ayyappan, Vettakkorumakan, and serpent god, etc. After koorayidal and uchappattu, the kurup does the kalamezhuthu (drawn on the floor using five colours). Marar (who plays drums) does the sandyavela after deeparadhana. The keli, thayampaka, kushalpattu, etc. are done according to the budget of the offerer. When the kalam is ready, the deity and the komaram will be welcomed to the kalam as a procession with a song by the kurup called mullakkan pattu. Here also according to the budget elephant, melam, and other decorative items can be added to the procession. The Velichappad (komaram) does the ritual dance known as eedum koorum chavittu and the Kalapradakshinam (rounding the kalam with different steps and rhythms). After the completion of Kalapradakshinam, the Brahmin priest is assigned the privilege of doing the kalam pooja of the image before the onset of the Kalampattu. After that, the kurup performs thiriuzichil, and the komaram performs kalathylattam, nalikerameru (breaking of coconut as offering), and kalam maykkal (kalasam – valedictory function – closing the function). After that kurup removes the koora (koora valikkal).

=== Kalam Ezhuthum Paattum ===
For centuries, the Kalam Ezhuthum Paattum, a traditional annual festival at Arakkulangara Bhagavathy temple, is held from the first day of Makaram (6th month of Malayalam Era) every year.
