= Ayyappanmudi =

Hindu temple in Kerala, India

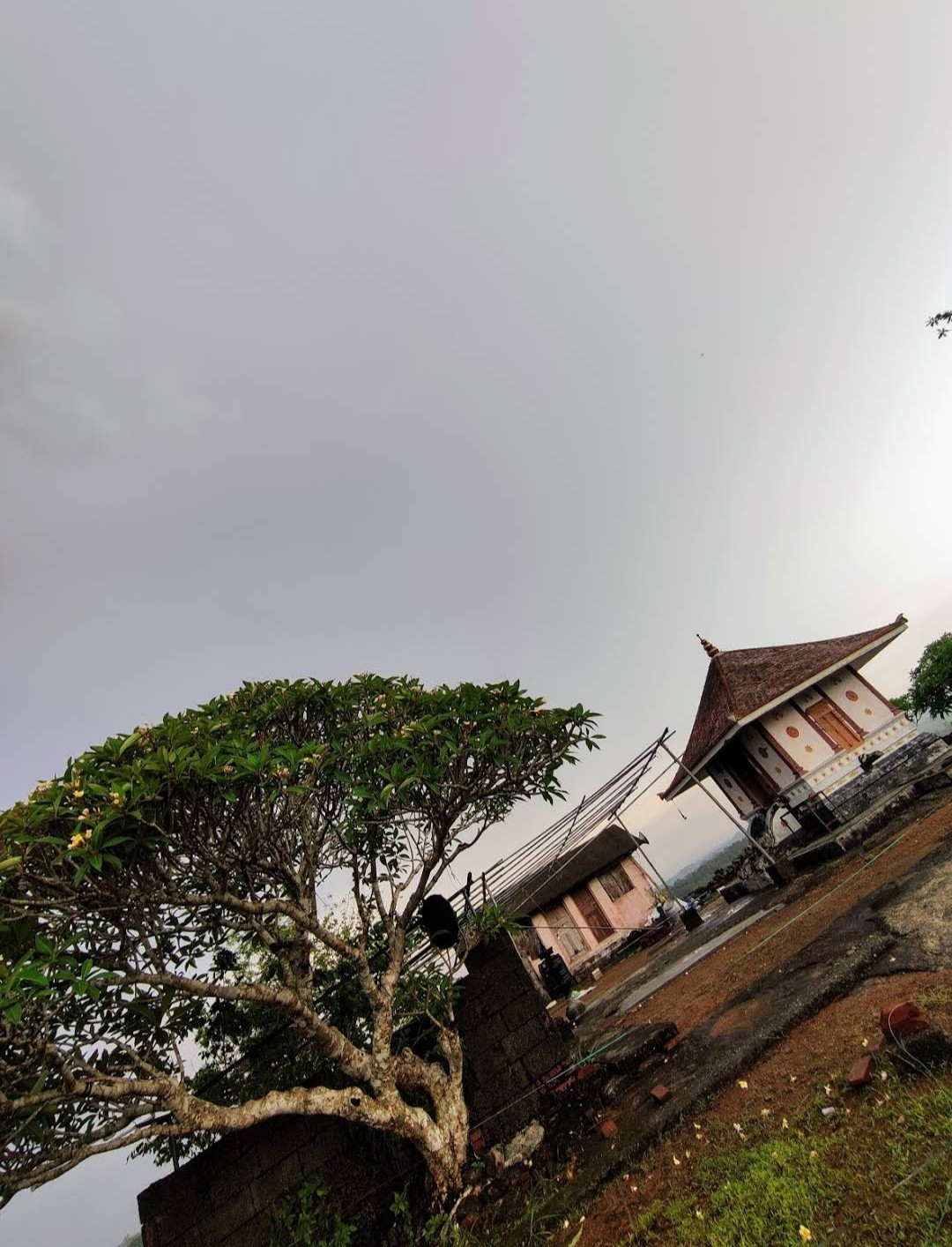
Temple in Ayyappanmudi

Ayyappanmudi is a Hindu temple located in between Chelad and Kallad at Kothamangalam in the Ernakulam District of Kerala, India. It is dedicated to the Hindu deity Ayyappan.

== Location ==
The temple is situated at the summit of Mount Ayyappan. The main attraction is a rock that is balanced at the top of the hill.

== Opening times ==
The temple is open only on the first Saturday of every month of the Malayalam calendar.

Gallery

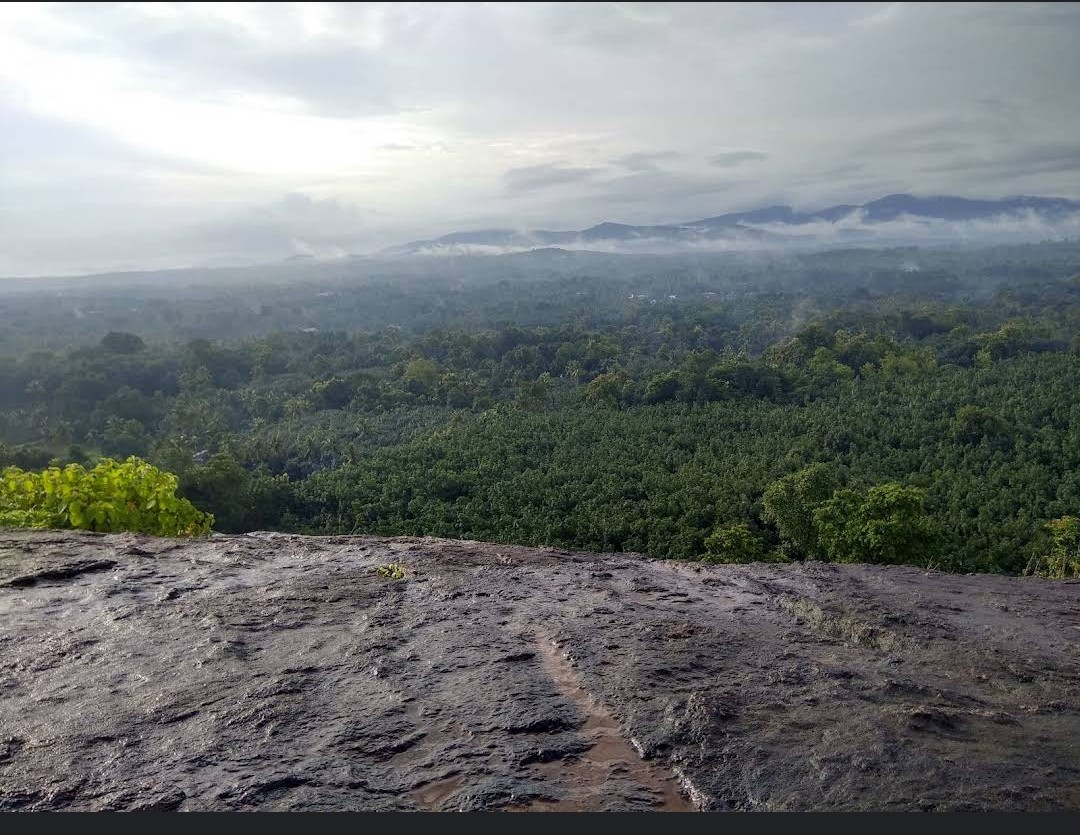
Hills in Ayyappanmudi

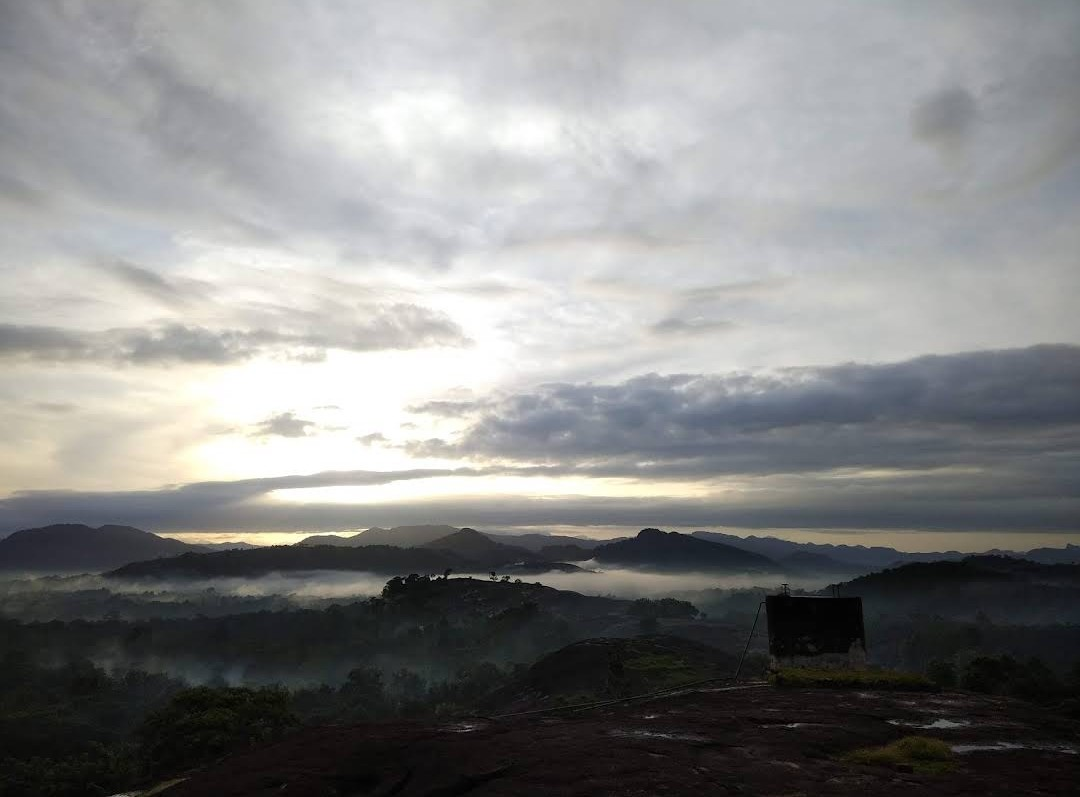
Hills in Ayyappanmudi

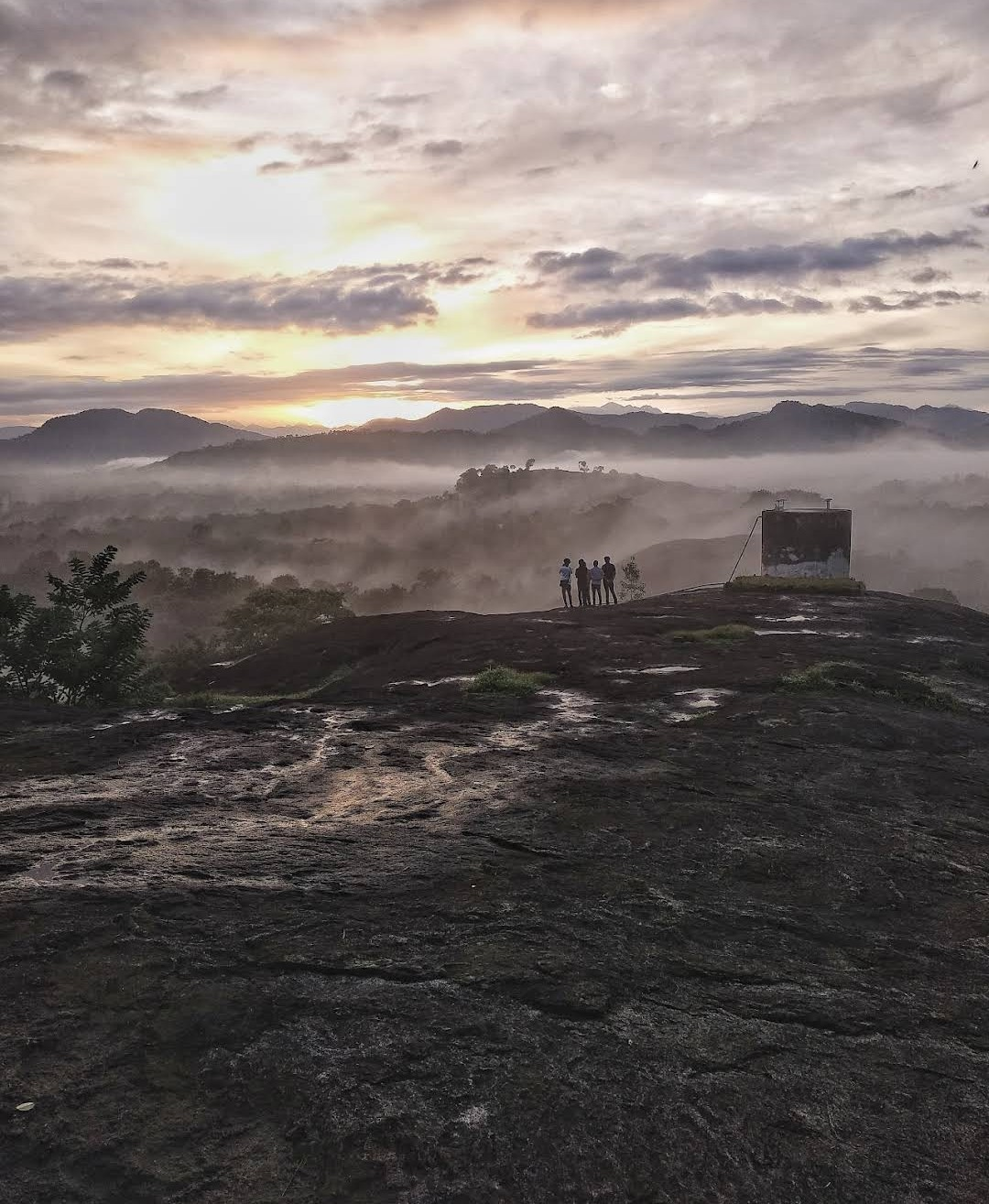
Dew and water tank in hill
