= Periyaoor =

Periyaoor (Periya-oor) was a famous place during the age of Ay Kingdom and is located near Kilimanoor, Thiruvananthapuram. The place is divided into two major parts named keezhperiyaoor and Melperiyaoor. Now it is called as Keezhperoor and chintranalloor respectively. Thirupalkadal Sreekrishnaswamy Temple is located at this village, which was the family temple of Venad dynasty.
