= Mullakkal Temple =

Mullakkal Rajarajeswari Temple
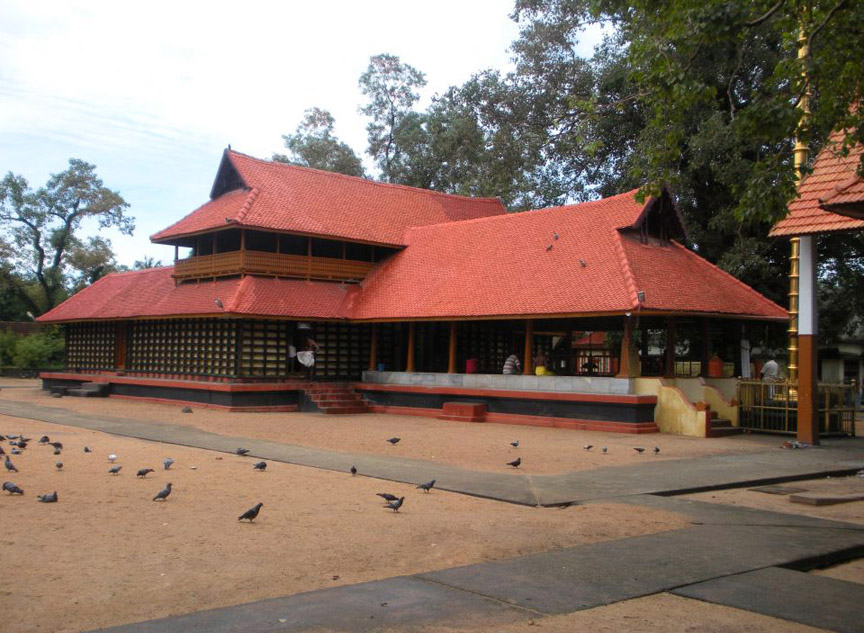
- Mullakkal Temple Alappuzha

- Rajarajeshwari Temple, Mullakkal, Alappuzha, Kerala

Religion
- Affiliation: Hinduism
- District: Alappuzha
- Deity: Mullakkal Bhagavathy (Durga)
- Festivals: Mullakkal Chirappu, Navaratri, Thrikkarthika

Location
- Location: Mullakkal, Alappuzha
- State: Kerala
- Country: India
- Coordinates: 9.497210°N 76.343171°E

Architecture
- Temple: One

The Mullakkal Rajarajeswari Temple is a Hindu temple in Mullakkal, Alappuzha, Kerala, India. The temple was designed and built in the old Kerala style. The temple grounds is filled with jasmine plants, after which the place may have been named, since 'mullai' in Tamil and 'mulla' in Malayalam mean jasmine. There are several stories related to the origin of the temple and its foundation. The idol in the inner shrine is that of the goddess Durga Bhagavathy. The temple is run by the Travancore Devaswom Board.

== The structure of the temple ==
The sanctum sanctorum or inner shrine has an open roof. There are other deities in the temple including Hanuman, Ganesha, Subrahmanya, Snake deities, Navagrahas, Krishna, and Ayyappan. A banyan tree within the temple walls houses a Shiva lingam beneath it.

== History ==
The temple is nearly 500 years old. There are many stories pertaining to the origin of the temple. According to one story the idol of the goddess was brought there by a group of exiled soldiers from Thekkumkur territory. They placed the idol in a jasmine garden. Later a temple was constructed in the jasmine garden by King Devanarayana of Chembagasery. Another story says that upon seeing the goddess at the Kodungalloor Bhagavathy temple, king Devanarayana of Chembagasery desired to bring the goddess back to his kingdom. That very night, the goddess appeared before him in his dreams and announced that she would indeed accompany him back to his kingdom. When he arrived in Alappuzha, the king decided to rest in a jasmine garden and put his umbrella down. When he awoke he could not move the umbrella. He took it as a sign that the goddess wished to remain there and built a temple for here there in the jasmine garden. Yet another popular story says that during the conquest of Kerala by Tippu Sultan of Mysore, a group of Namboodiri Brahmins escaped from Malabar taking the idol of Annapurneswari with them. They spotted a jasmine garden and decided to place the idol there and build a shrine there. The temple was later built around the shrine.

Prior to 1961, the idol placed in the inner shrine was that of Annapurneswari, who had a ladle in one hand and a pot in the other.

In 1961 however the original idol was replaced. It is said that a stranger entered the sanctum sanctorum and embraced the idol after which several cracks were observed on the idol. The priests took it to mean that the goddess was instructing them to make a new idol. And so on 16 July 1962 a new idol, that of Rajarajeswari, was placed in the inner sanctum, replacing the old one. Later the idols of Krishna and various serpent gods were introduced and placed in different shrines.

== Customs and Rituals ==
Special foods and sweet dishes are offered to the goddess as Naivedyam. According to legend, when the Annapurneswari idol was worshipped on the first day, the prasadam consisted of vadas made with whole urud gram that was offered by a family in the neighbourhood. Following that convention the same prasadam is made today and the ingredients are offered by various patrons. This special prasadam is usually offered at night.

== Festivals ==
There are many festivals associated with the Mullakkal Rajarajeswari Temple. The biggest of them all is the Mullakkal Chirappu and it lasts forty one days. The festival commences early in the month of Vrishchikam (Middle of November) and ends on the eleventh of the month of Dhanu (December–January). The final 11 days of this festival is called the Chirappu festival. The last two days of this Festival are the most special and sacred. The occasion is marked by thousands of people who come to witness grand parades led by caparisoned elephants.

The Mullakkal Chirappu is celebrated in the temple with grandeur and with religious austerity. Besides regular puja, cultural programs associated with Kerala's heritage, are celebrated as the integral part of celebration. On the final day, 'Annadanam' is organized offering food to approximately 3000-4000 devotees. Musicians and artists are invited to perform at the temple premises in the evening and the festive ceremonies end with fireworks.

The first Sunday of December is celebrated as women's festival. On this day all rituals and worships are done by women only. Ladies came from different areas and they lit lamps in the temple.

Navarathri festival is also celebrated with great grandeur in the Mullakkal Bhagawthy temple. On Maha Navami day at least 150-200 baby girls are given new cloths and they are worshipped as divine Kumaris. "Theyattu" is celebrated on that night. During this function a huge portrait of the Goddess is made on the floor with different colored powder. Ace dancers dance on this color Rongolee and slowly this portrait gets removed from the floor. On Maha Navami Children place their text books on the main Shrine for Pooja; during this time special poojas are performed. "Bommai Kolu Festival" is an integral part of temple's festive celebrations when all elderly women from Hindu society set these 'Bommas' in the 'Oottupura'; These women offer their sincere prayers by reading Bhagavatham loudly, the main holy scripture of Hindus and offer their prayers. Lalithasahasranamam is also recited during the festival days. In the olden days, elephants adorned with "nettipattam" were paraded in the evenings and pradakshina around the temple 'prahara' were done with the deity "seated" on the main elephant to the accompaniment of chendamelam. "Thaipooyakavadi" is another significant festival celebrated in this temple once in a year. During this festival about 15 Kavadis take part in the parade and traditional dance session in majestic manner.
