= Vishu =

Indian festival

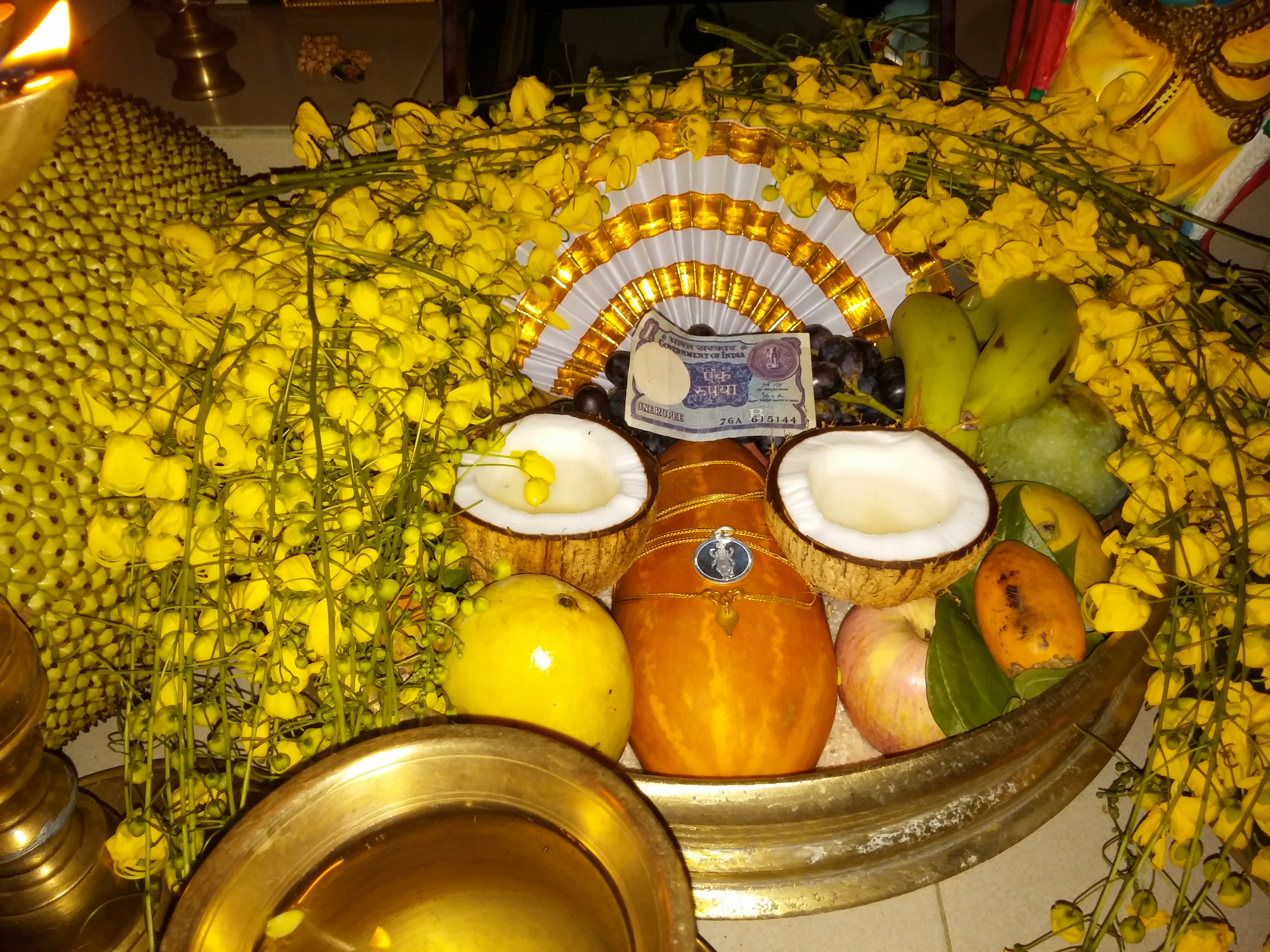
- A traditional Vishu kani setting with auspicious items.
- Official name: Vishu
- Observed by: Malayalis
- Type: cultural, seasonal
- Significance: Malayali New Year (traditional)
- Observances: Kani, Kaineetam, Kanji, Kani konna, Padakkam (firecrackers)
- Begins: 4:00am Brahmamuhurtha
- Ends: end of the day
- Date: First day of the month of medam (Aries) in the Malayalam calendar
- 2026 date: Wed, 15 April
- Related to: South and Southeast Asian solar New Year

Vishu (Malayalam: വിഷു, IPA: [ʋiʂu]) is a Hindu festival celebrated by the Malayalis in Kerala and Mahe of India. Vishu falls on the first day of the month of Medam, the first month of the Solar calendar used in Malabar of Kerala, (April 14 or 15 in the Gregorian calendar), signifying the solar new year as the sun moves into the zodiac sign of Aries. It is the traditional new year, while the Kollam era calendar, which was later formed at Kollam in 825 CE, new year falls on the 1st Chingham (August 16 or 17).

Vishu falls either on the same day or near April 14/15 as other new years in parts of India where the sun's path is followed, such as in states like Tamil Nadu, Odisha, Bengal, Northeast India, Punjab, Haryana, Uttarakhand, and Jammu. Additionally, the Songkran festival of South East Asia also falls on the Vishu date, with the significance of the Kanikonna as part of Laos new year same like of Vishu celebrations in Kerala.The Sinhalese New Year in Sri Lanka also coincides with the Vishu date, sharing similar traditions such as the Vishu Kani, flower blossoms, traditional foods, and fireworks

The festival is marked by family time, preparing colourful auspicious items and viewing these as the first thing on the Vishu day (Vishukkani). In particular, Malayalis seek to view the golden blossoms of the Indian laburnum (Kani Konna), money or silver items, cloth (pattu), mirror, rice, coconut, cucumber, fruits and other harvest products. Days before Vishu, people start bursting fireworks at their houses and it concludes with lot of fireworks on day of Vishu. People wear new clothes (Kodi) and they eat a feast called Sadhya. In Kaineettam, elders give a small amount of pocket money to children.

== Etymology and origin ==
Vishu, from Sanskrit Viṣuvam, literally means 'equal', and it connoted to the celebration of spring equinox in the past. The spring equinox however occurs 24 days before the day of Vishu, on 21 March/Meenam 7, due to precession of equinoxes.

== Religious significance ==
Vishu marks the first day of the astronomical year, a celebration of new beginnings and prosperity. A key tradition during Vishu is the vishukani, a carefully arranged collection of auspicious items such as fruits, flowers, coins, and gold. It is believed that seeing auspicious things at the very beginning of the new year brings luck, a tradition that is part of Kerala's culture. Most people include Krishna's idol in the 'kani', as he is considered auspicious to see first. It is believed that it is on this day Lord Krishna killed the demon Narakasura. Another legend is it commemorates the resuming of the ascent of Sun from east after the death of Ravana, which he had stopped.

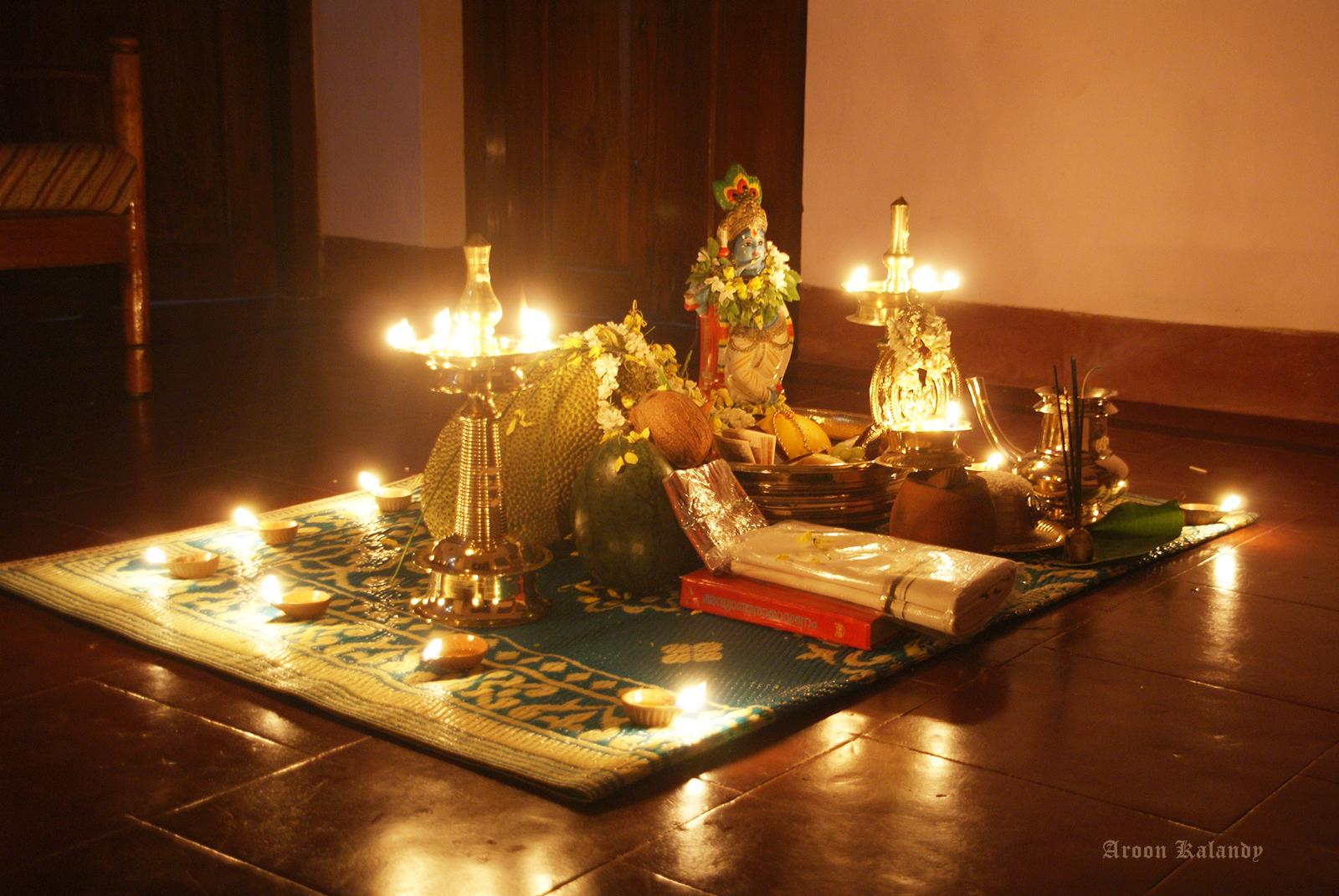
Vishu kani from Calicut, Kerala, India

== Practices ==
=== Vishukkani ===
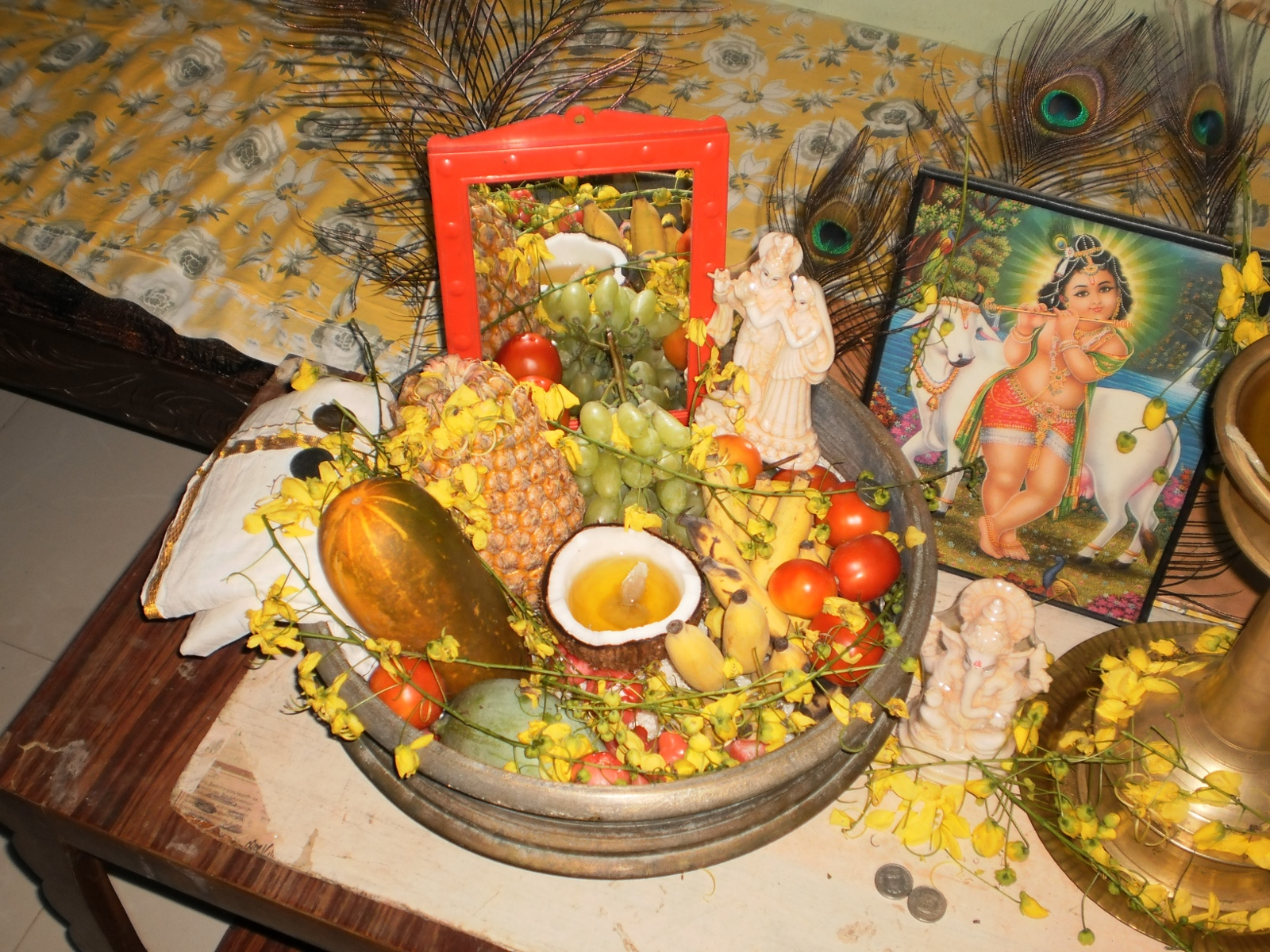
Vishu Kani in Kerala

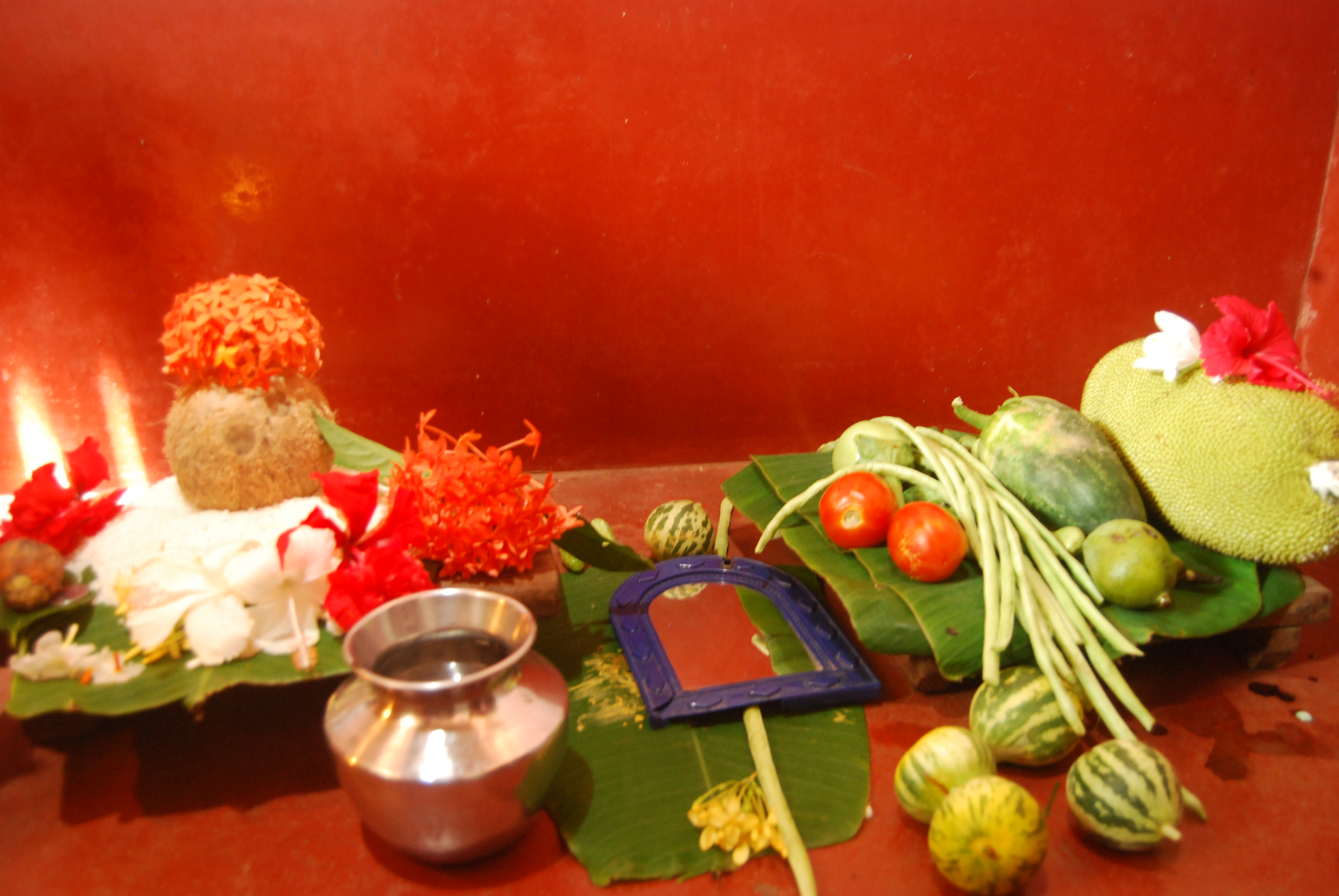
Bisu in Tulunadu Coastal Karnataka

The Malayalam word "kani" literally means "that which is seen first," so "Vishukkani" means "that which is seen first on Vishu." The traditional belief is that one's future is a function of what one experiences and that the new year will be better if one views auspicious, joyful things as the first thing on Vishu. Therefore, Malayalis spend the day before preparing a setting, usually a tray, of auspicious items. This setting is the first thing they see when they wake up on the Vishu day.

The Vishukkani setting consists of items such as rice, golden lemon, golden cucumber, coconut cut open, jack fruit, Kanmashi, betel leaves, arecanut, Aranmula kannadi (Vaalkannadi), golden colour Konna flowers (Cassia fistula) which bloom in the season of Vishu, nilavilakku, idol of Vishnu or his incarnation Krishna, and other auspicious items. Mirror in Vishukani is a symbol of seeing yourself as a part of abundance you see in the form of Kani.

One of the Vishu related devotional songs (also popularised as a song from the 1962 Malayalam movie 'Omanakkuttan') that communicate the glory of Krishna in his childhood form, begins with the following lines:

കണികാണും നേരം കമലാനേത്രന്റെ

നിറമേറും മഞ്ഞത്തുകിൽ ചാർത്തീ

കനകക്കിങ്ങിണി വളകൾ മോതിരം

അണിഞ്ഞു കാണേണം ഭഗവാനേ

(Oh Lotus-eyed, during the vision of Kani, may You be seen in a glowing yellow costume adorned with bangles, bells and rings of gold.)

The tradition is that elders light the lamps after waking up, then wakes up juniors in the family. As soon as you wake up, you walk to the kani eyes closed, and sees Kani as the first scene of the year. The same tradition is followed in Kongu Nadu region on Puthandu day.

Traditionally, the vegetables, fruits, nuts, etc. that are included in Vishukkani are usually those that are home-grown - coconut, cucumber, mango, pineapple, jackfruit, betel-leaves, arecanut, etc. Kanikonna (Golden Showers) is one of the trees that is planted in the home-ground and community-grounds, and they blossom during the time of Vishu. It is also during the time of Vishu, that people lend their ears to the calls of Vishupakshi.

=== Vishu Cuisine ===
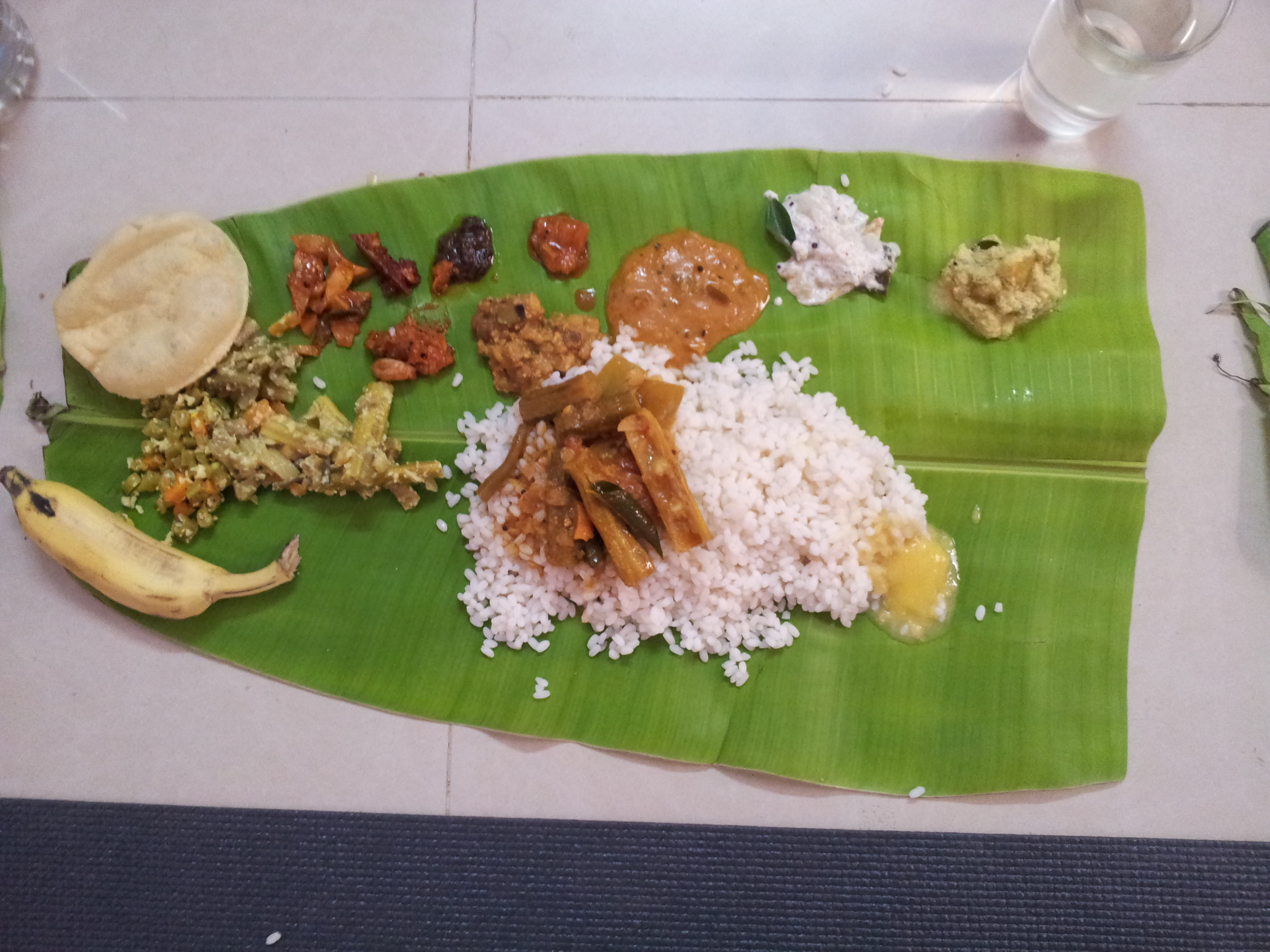
Vishu Sadhya served in 2013.

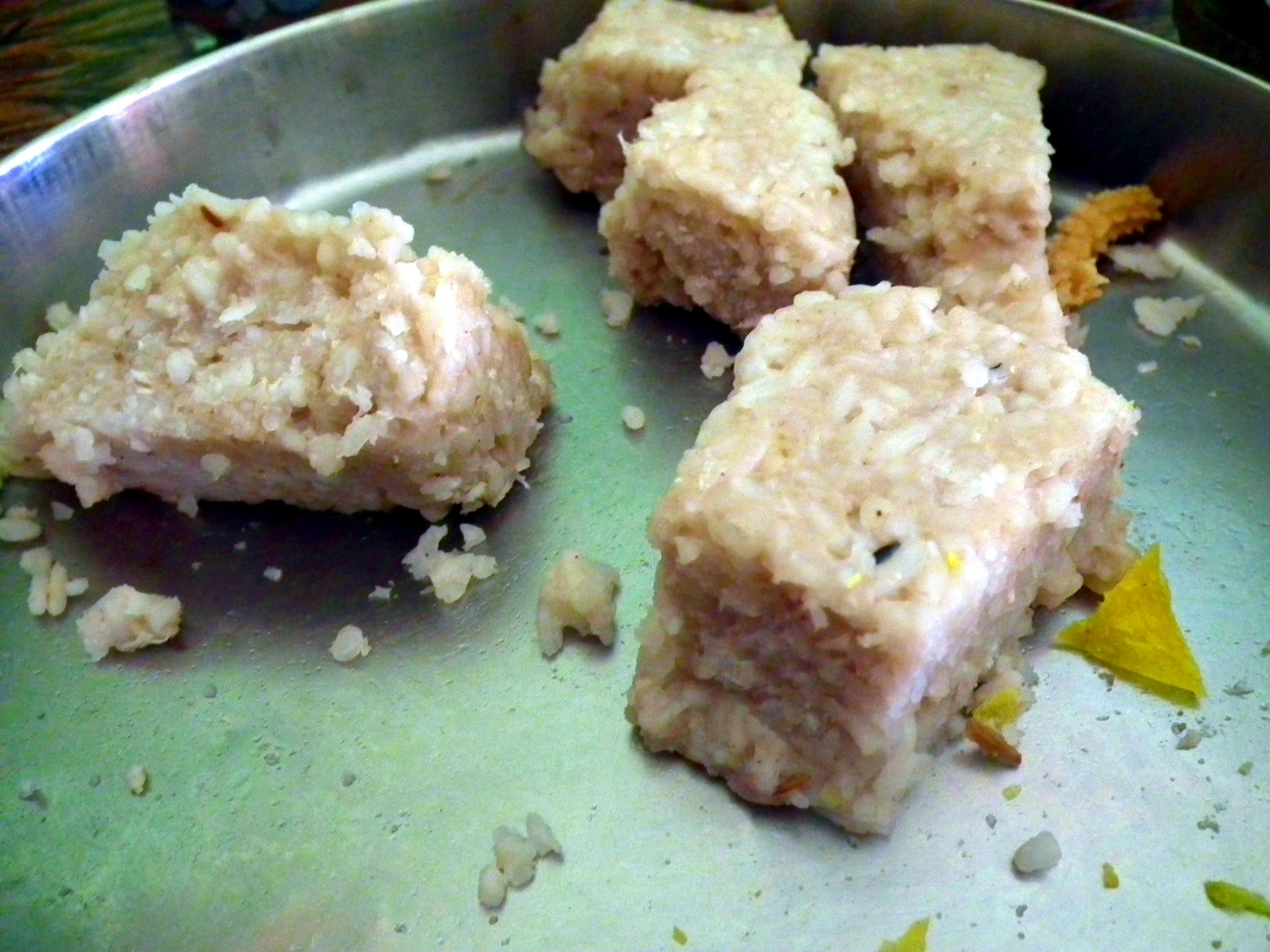
Vishu katta

The Sadhya (feast) is a major part of all Kerala festivals, special dishes called Vishu Kanji, Thoran and Vishu katta are also made. The Kanji is made of rice, coconut milk and spices. Vishu katta is a delicacy prepared from freshly harvested rice powder and coconut milk served with jaggery. For Thoran, the side dish, there are also mandatory ingredients. Other important Vishu delicacies include Veppampoorasam (a bitter preparation of neem) and Mampazhappulissery (a sour or ripe mango soup) Even temple offerings called bewu bella, include a mix of sweet jaggery, bitter neem, and other flavors.

The mixing of sweet, salty, sour, bitter and astringent flavors for the new year Vishu meal is similar to the pacchadi food prepared on new year day such as Ugadi by Hindus in Karnataka, Telangana and Andhra Pradesh in the Indian subcontinent. These traditional festive recipes, that combine different flavors, are a symbolic reminder that one must expect all flavors of experiences in the coming new year, that no event or episode is wholly sweet or bitter, experiences are transitory and ephemeral, and to make the most from them.

=== Padakkam ===
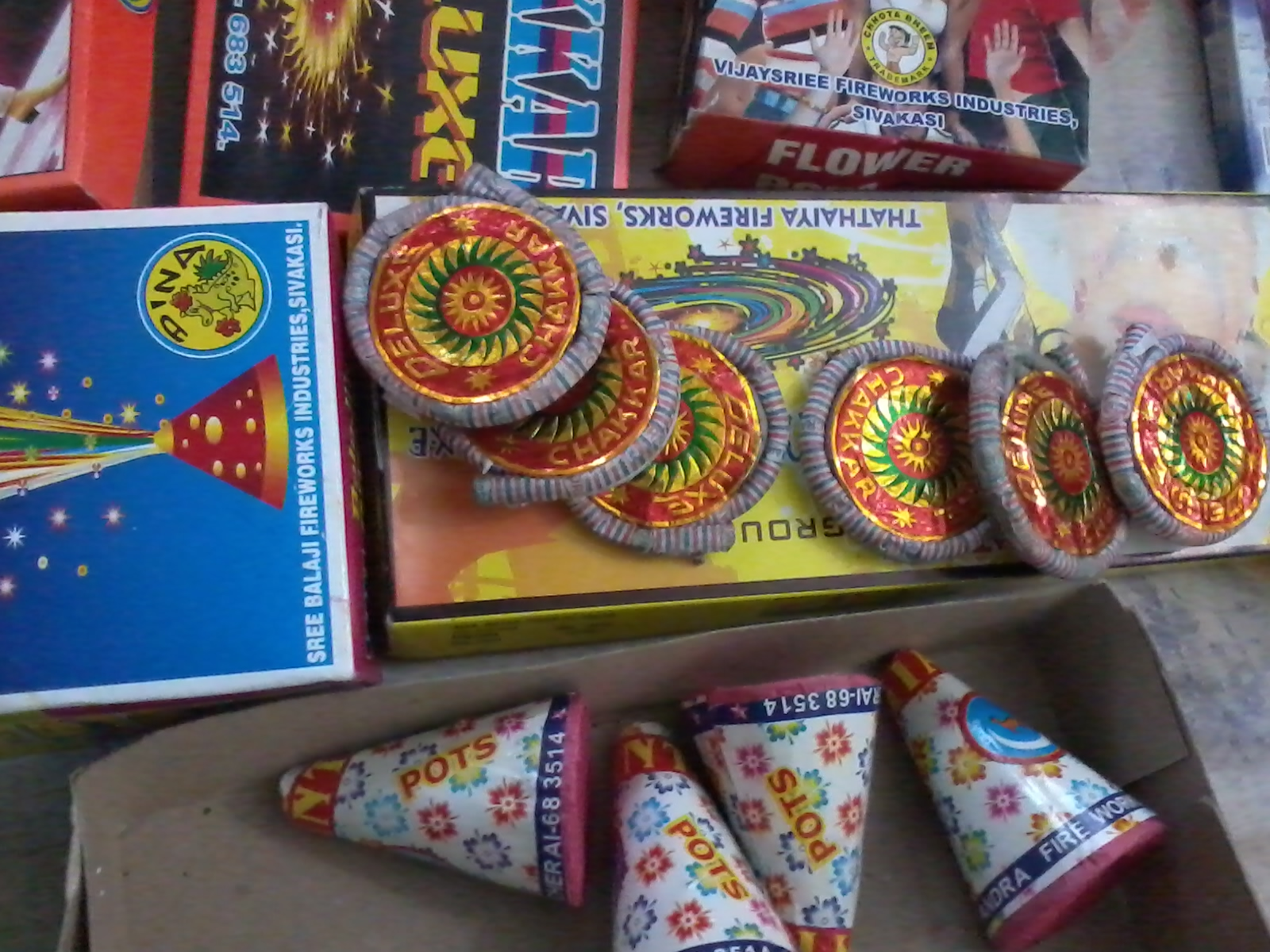
Vishu Padakkam

The word 'Padakkam' in Malayalam means firecrackers. Firecrackers are burst during Vishu the same way north Indians burst firecrackers during Diwali.

=== Konna ===
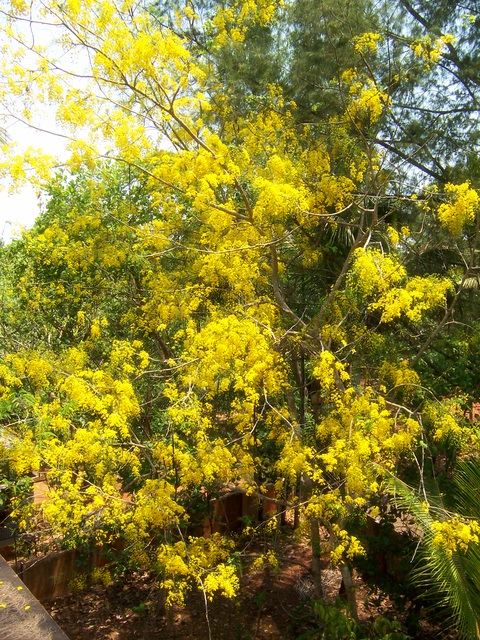
Cassia fistula, Golden Shower Tree

Konna (Cassia fistula), commonly known as golden shower is the flower of the Vishu festival.

=== Other customs ===
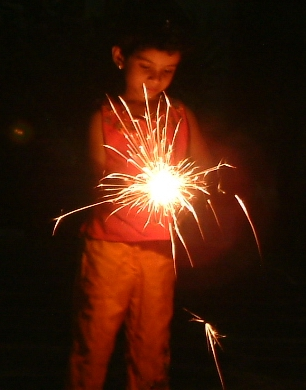
A child playing with fireworks on Vishu

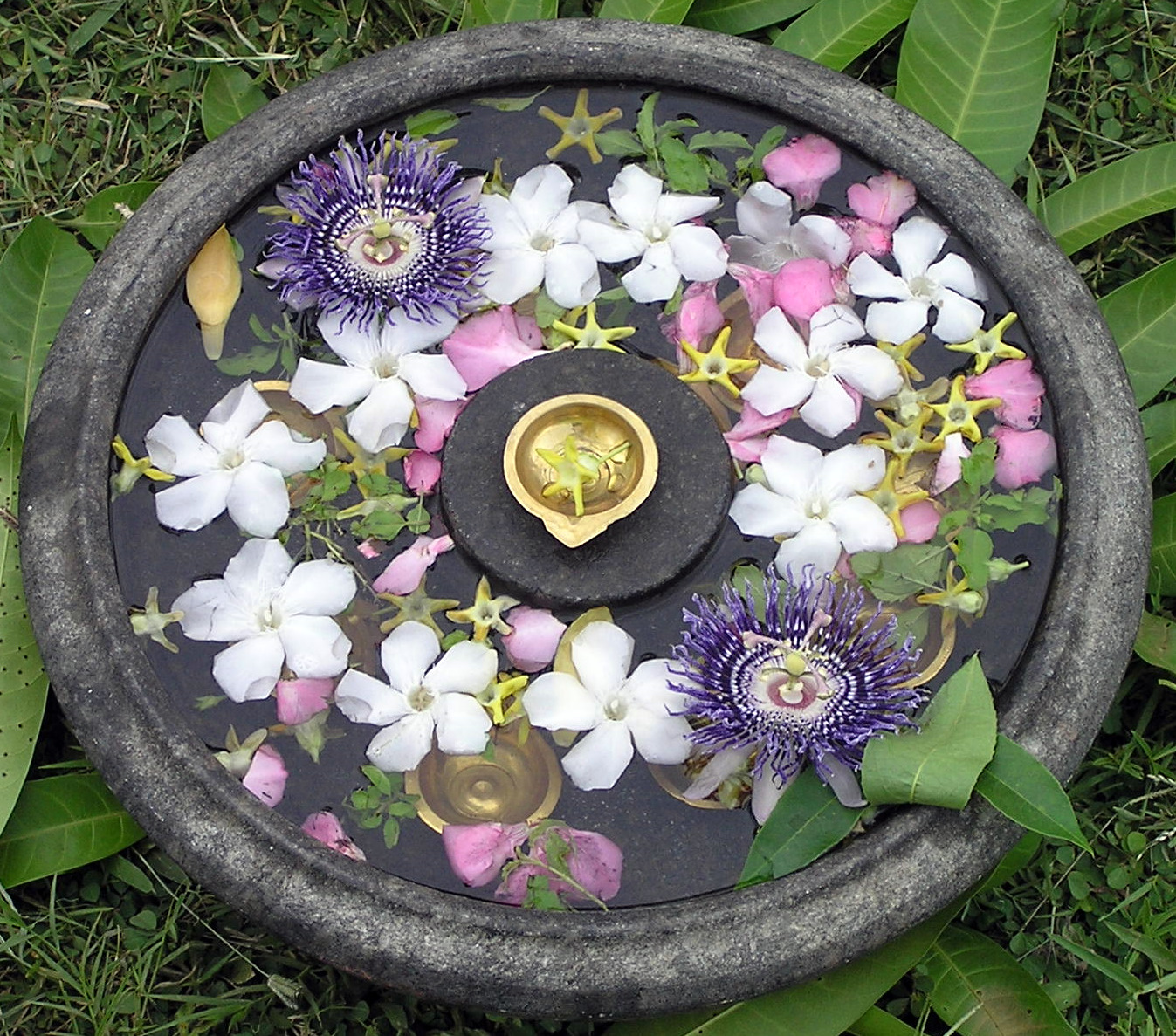
Flower arrangement in Uruli during Vishu

The tradition of buying of new clothes for the occasion of Vishu is called Puthukodi or Vishukodi. There is also a popular tradition of elders giving money to younger ones or dependents of the family. This is called Vishukkaineetam. Another tradition is of giving alms and contributing to community charity. Children enjoy setting off firecrackers. Kaineettam literally means 'extension of hand'. As seen in many Hindu expressions of good-will, charity and philanthropy, and sustenance of dharma, the kaineettam usually ends with the numerical 1, indicating a new beginning, while also a continuation. For example, Vishukkaineettam is gifted in amounts such as Rs 11, Rs 21, Rs 51, 101, etc. In earlier times, many used to give the kaineettam of a rupee and a quarter, with the quarter being an indicator of growth in abundance and prosperity.

=== Pathamudayam ===
Pathamudayam is celebrated on the 10th day of Medam Month in Malayalam Era and 10th day after Vishu. According to the tradition, ‘Pathamudayam’ is the day when the sun is most powerful and astrological science support the believe. To symbolise the ten sunrises from Vishu, traditional oil lamps with 10 wicks are lit in every house.

=== Velayum Kummaattiyum ===
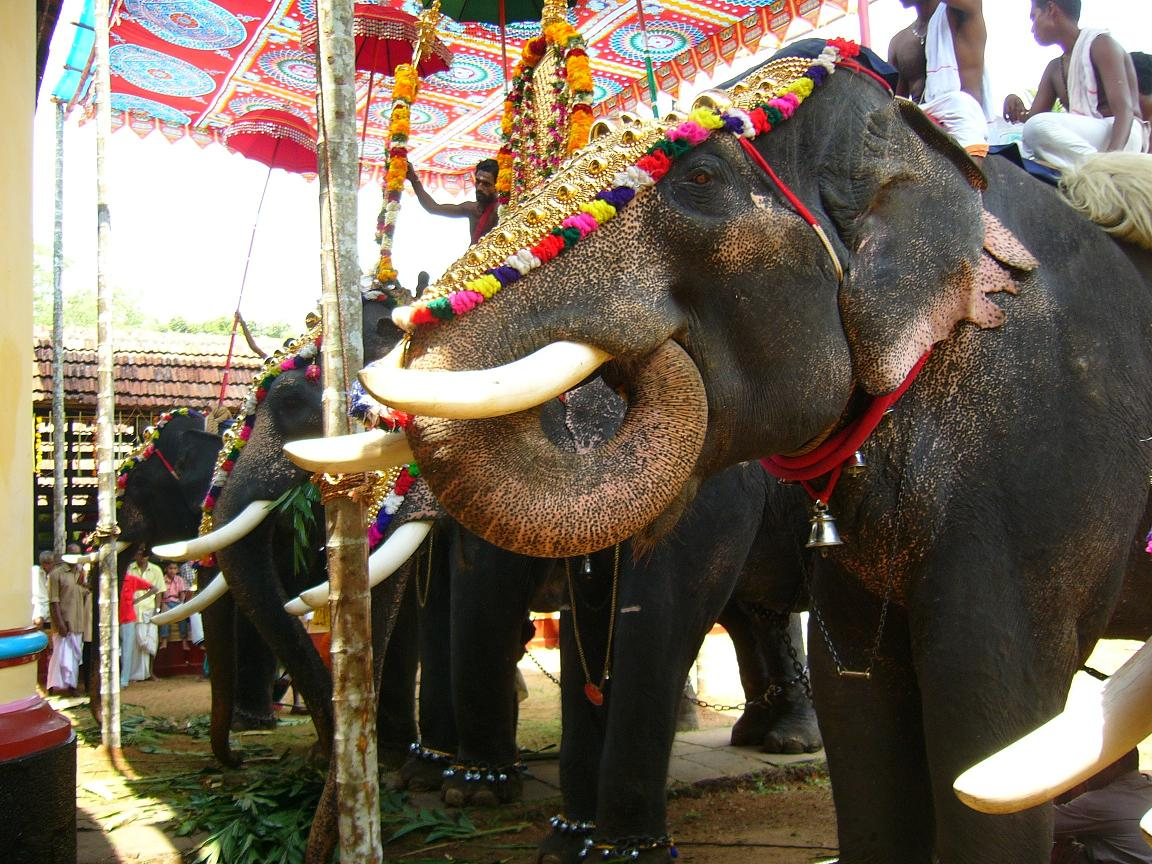
Temple vishuvela

A number of festivals are associated with Vishu - this includes vishuvela, vishukummaatti, etc. In some of the rural regions of Kerala, the elders of the various castes and clans of that region ("kaaranavar") come together during the night of Vishu and engage in "koorayidal" - a ritual indicating the starting of a period of auspiciousness. This may extend for many weeks, till the culmination of the vela/ kummaatti. During this time, the members of these castes and clans engage in acts of nobility. Even those who consume non-vegetarian items and alcoholic drinks move themselves away from these. Acts of violence are forbidden in the 'desam' (region) during this time.

== Related holidays ==
The date of Vishu coincides with that of festivals in other parts of India. Vaisakhi, celebrated by Hindus and Sikhs in north and central India, marks the solar new year, as does the Tamil New Year day called Puthandu. Likewise, Bihu is celebrated in Assam. The new year day is on or next to 14 April every year, and is also the new year for many Buddhist communities in parts of southeast Asia such as Myanmar and Cambodia, likely an influence of their shared culture in the 1st millennium CE.

Bishu, a Nepali festival, is celebrated on Baisakh 1 of Nepal calendar in Farwest Province of Nepal. It is the most important festival in that region.

However, this is not the universal new year for all Hindus. For some, such as those in and near Gujarat, the new year festivities coincide with the five day Diwali festival. For many others, the new year falls on Ugadi and Gudi Padwa, which falls a few weeks earlier.

== See also ==
- Indian New Year
- Bisu Parba
- Bizhu
- Gudhi Padwa
- Onam
- Bihu
- Vaisakhi
- Pohela Boishakh
- Tamil Puthandu
- Songkran, a Buddhist New Year festival around 14 April, celebrated in Thailand, Cambodia, Laos etc.
- Ugadi, New year of many people of Karnataka, Telangana and Andhra Pradesh.
