= Kerala New Year (Kollam era) =

New year on the Malayalam Calendar

The Kerala New Year used to be on the day of the vernal equinox, i.e., the day when the sun is considered to move from the southern to the northern hemisphere. However, the first Malayalam month is Chingam ചിങ്ങം according to the Malayalam Calendar.

Until the modern Malayalam Kollam Era was adopted in 825 CE, the first day of the Malayalam month of Medam (മേടം) was considered to be the new year. This day is still celebrated in Kerala as Vishu, and it coincides with similar New Year festivities in most of India.
