= Kattakampal Temple =

Hindu temple in India

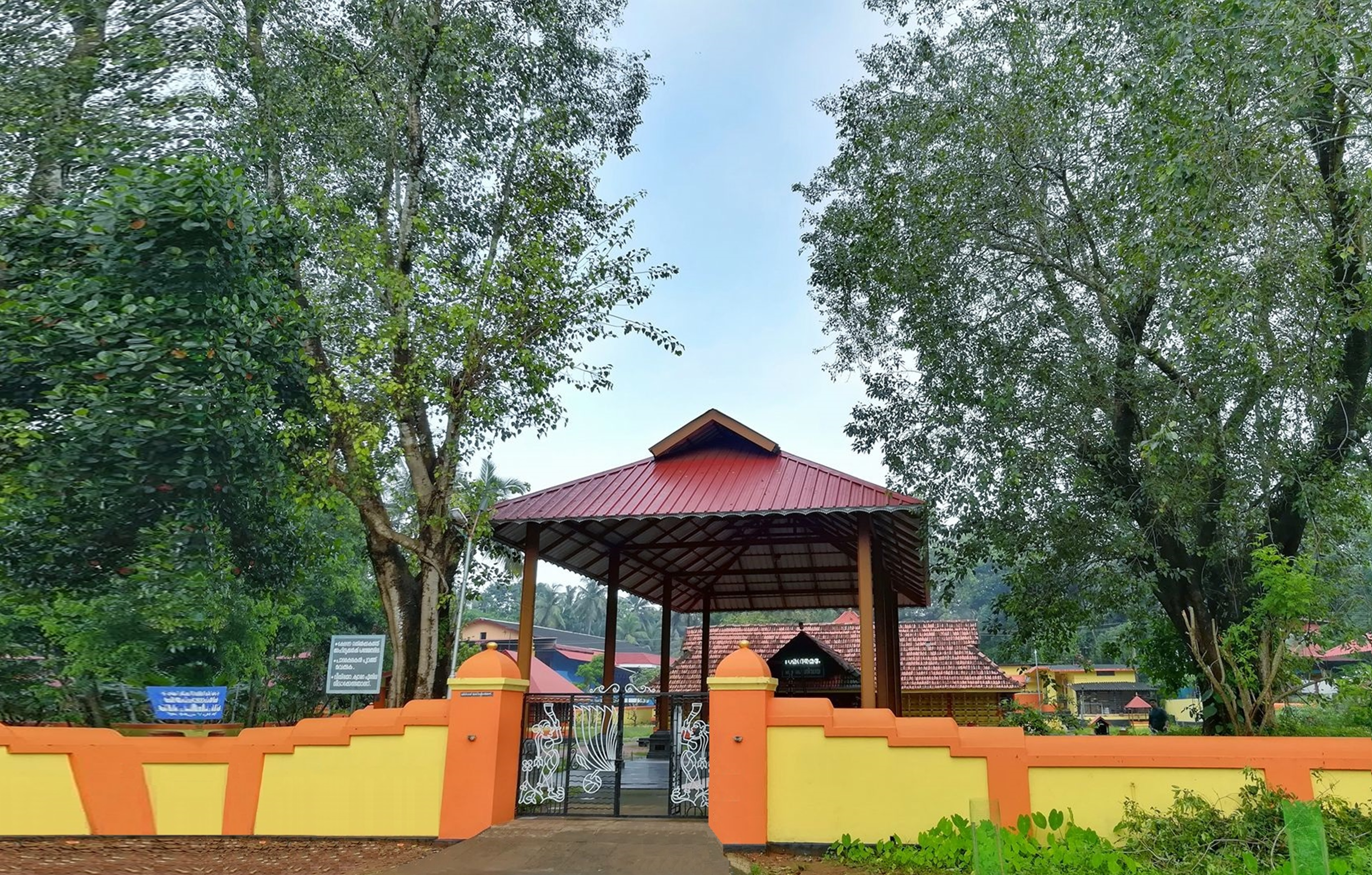
- Temple entrance facing east

- Shiva Temple, Kattakampal, Thrissur, Kerala

Religion
- Affiliation: Hinduism
- District: Thrissur
- Deity: Shiva, Bhagavathi
- Festival: Kattakampal Pooram

Location
- Location: Kattakampal
- State: Kerala
- Country: India
- Interactive map of Kattakampal Temple
- Coordinates: 10.689557°N 76.037511°E

Architecture
- Type: Kerala style
- Completed: 2000 Years Old

Specifications
- Temple: One
- Monument: 1
- Elevation: 29.76 m (98 ft)

Kattakampal Temple is located at Kattakampal village in Thrissur district. The main deity of the temple is Shiva in the Sanctum sanctorum facing east. But temple is famous for Kattakampal Bhagavathy in the separate Sanctum sanctorum facing west. It is believed that this temple is one of the 108 Shiva Temples of Kerala and is installed by sage Parasurama dedicated to Shiva. According to legends the Kattakampal temple is considered as 2000 years old. Temple is famous for the annual Pooram celebrations (Kattakampal Pooram).

== Kattakampal Pooram ==
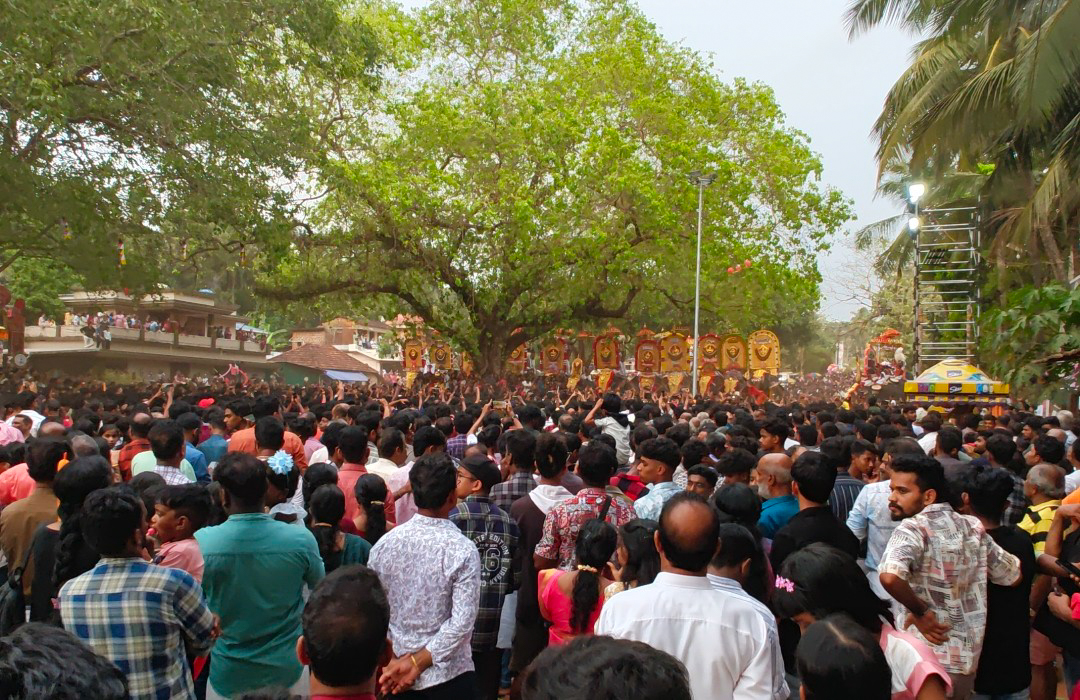
Pooram

Temple is famous for the annual Pooram celebrations.Seven days of festival finishes on Pooram day (Pooram asterism) in the Malayalam month of Medam (April / May). The major highlight of the pooram festival is the Kali - Darika War and Darika Vadham (killing of the demon Darikasura).

Kali

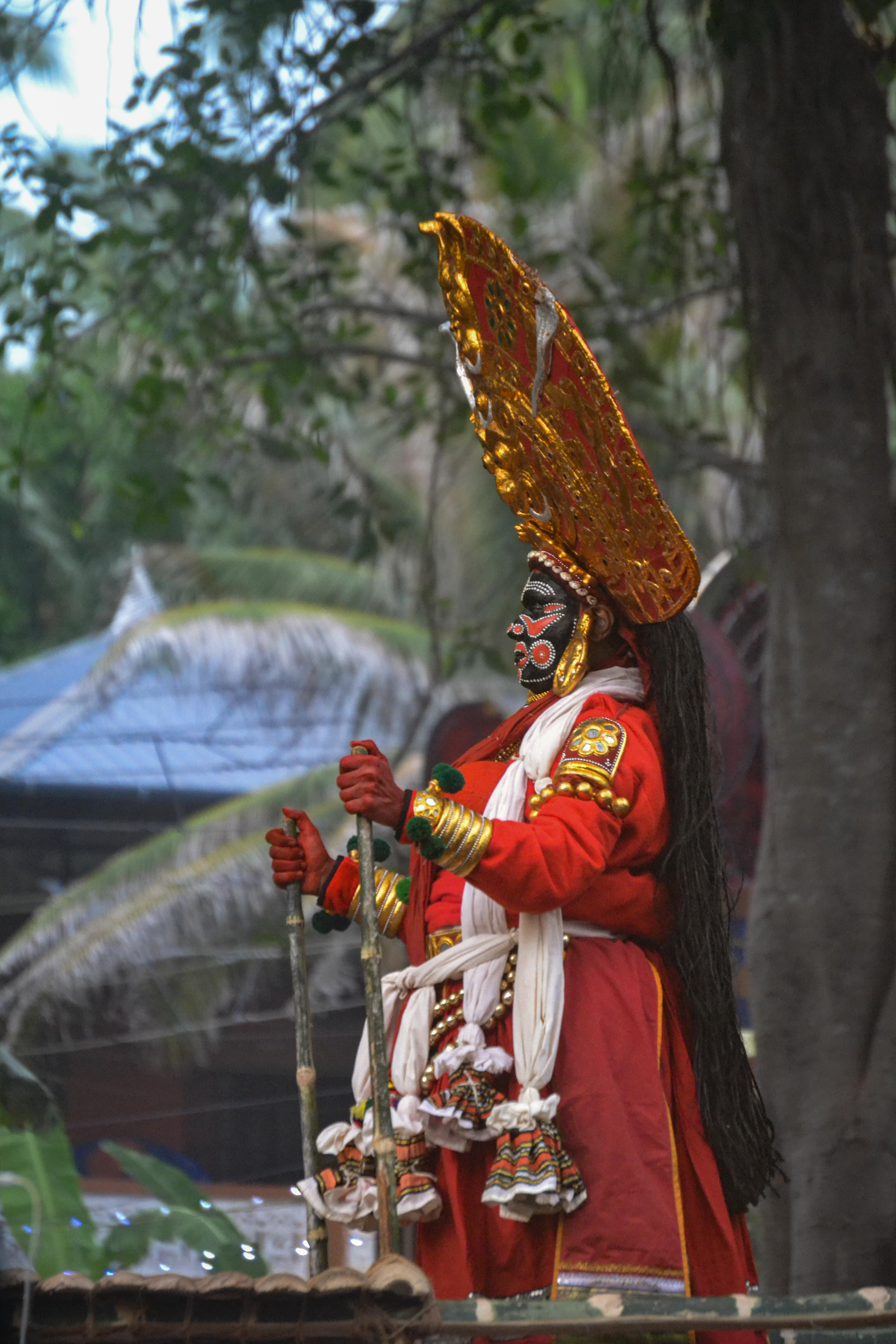
Kali

Darikan

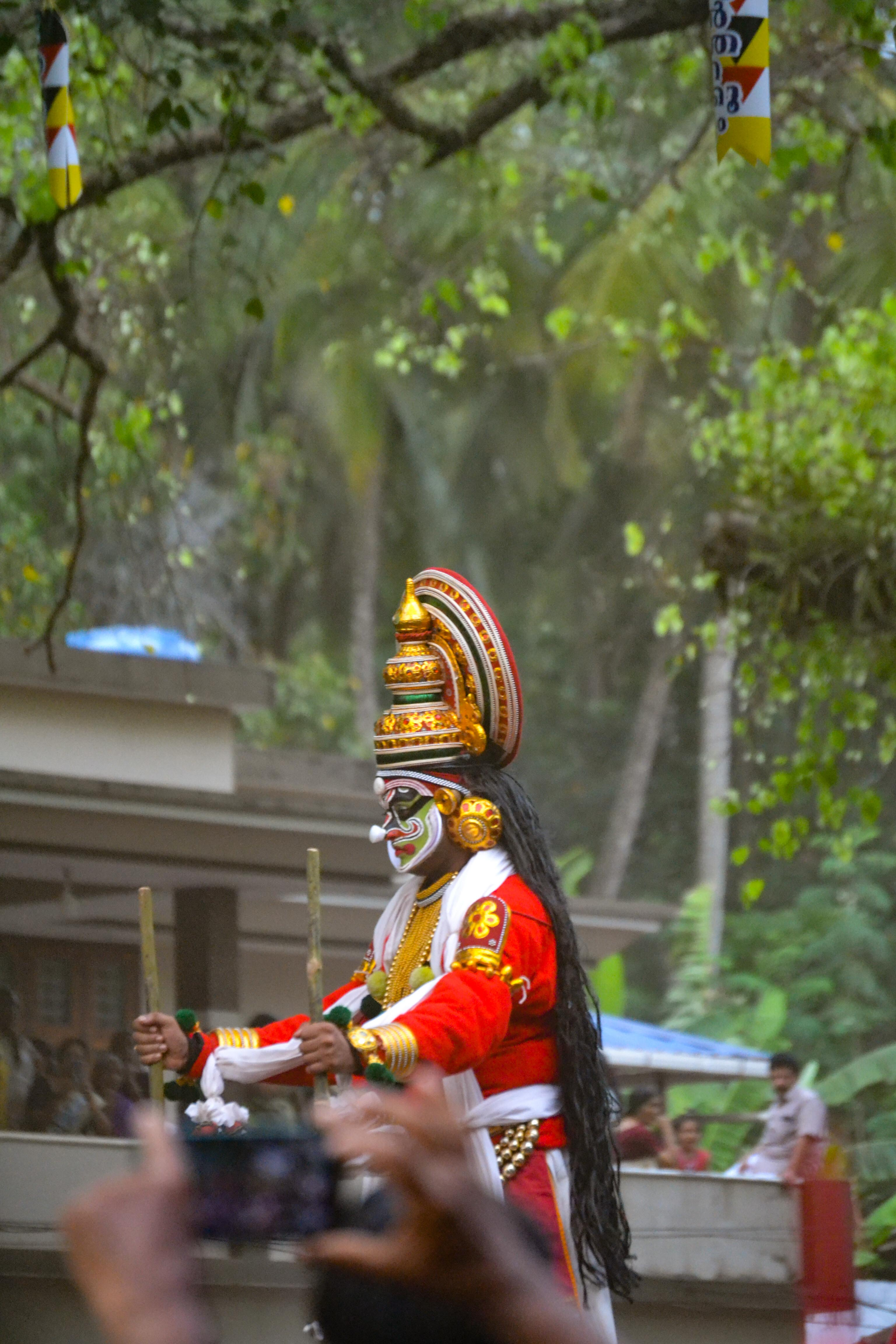
Darikan

== Temple architecture ==
The temple is situated in Kattakampal village tiny peninsula in Thrissur district. The temple comprises a plot of land about two acres. The temples of Shiva are of great significance when inspecting temple architecture. The over-all temple complex faces west.

== Location ==
Kattakambal Temple is located at Kattakampal of Kunnamkulam in Thrissur district.

== Temple Photos ==
Kattakampal Temple

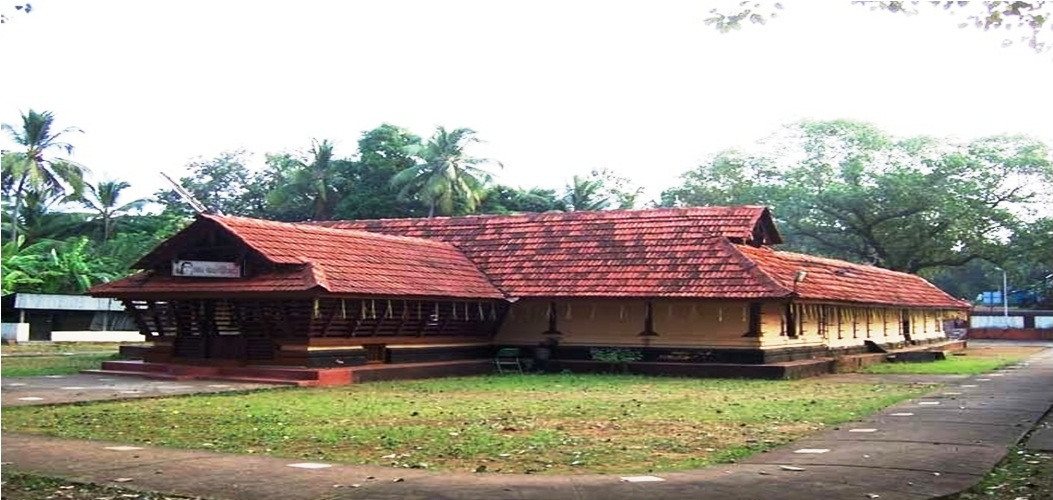
Lord Shiva Temple Nalambalam

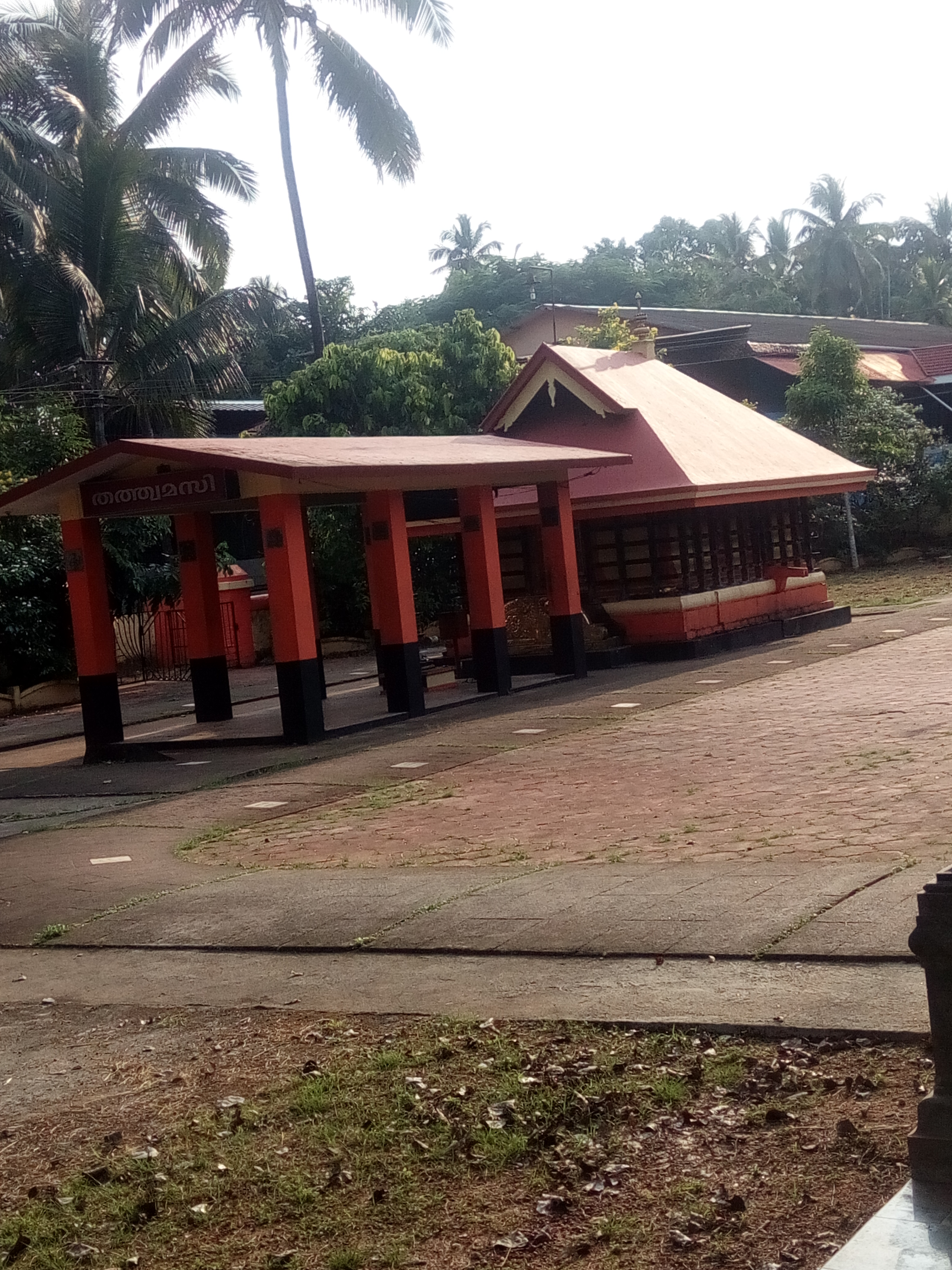
Sub Deity Temple

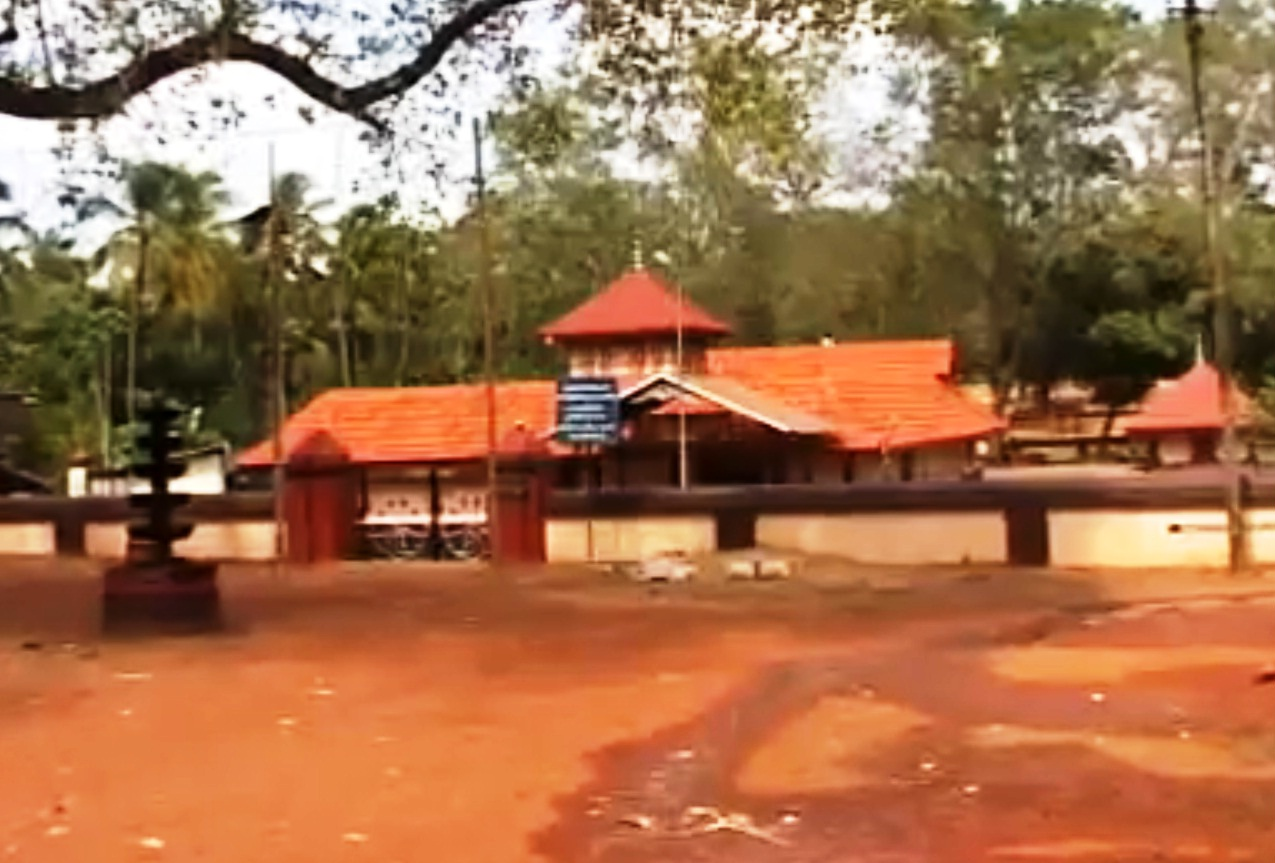
Devi Kali Temple Facing East

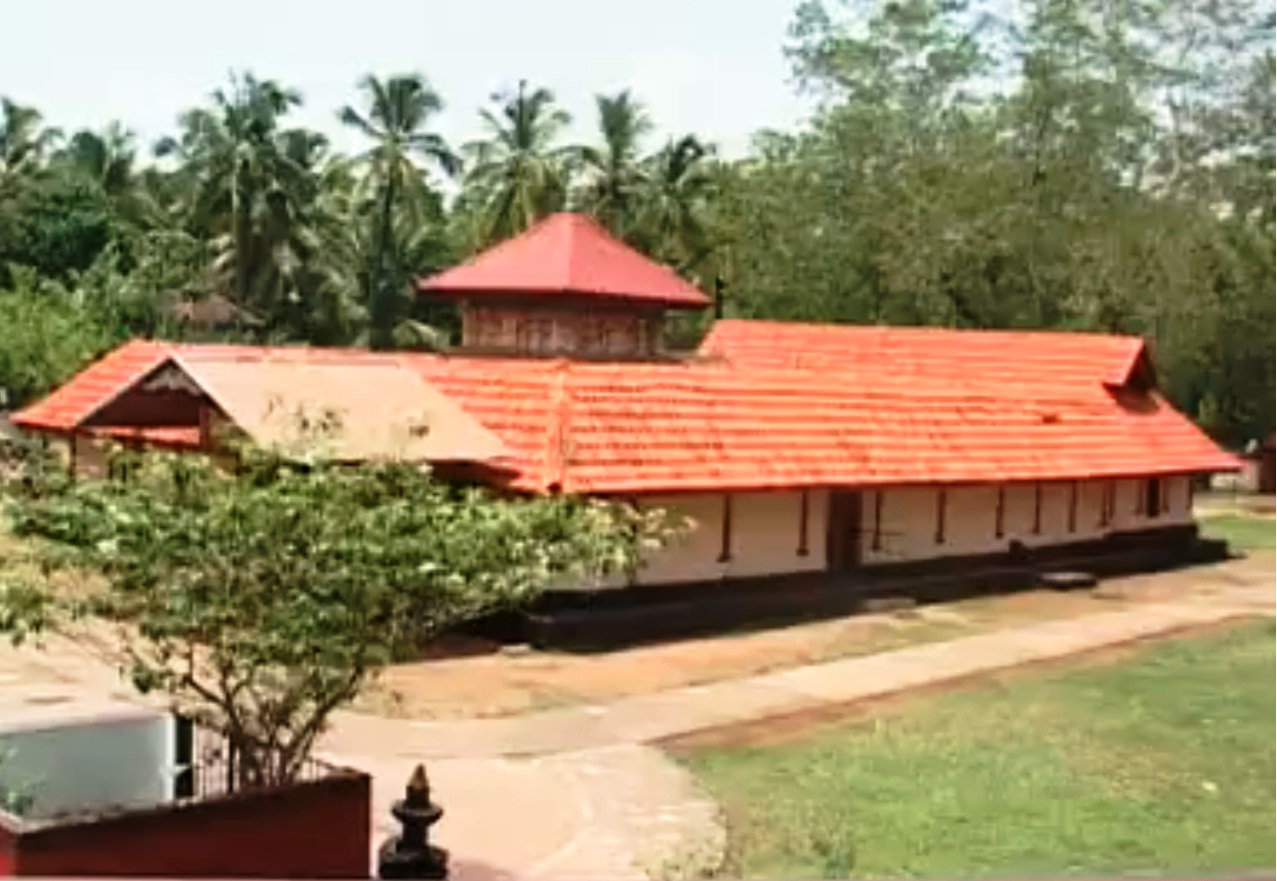
Temple Nalambalam

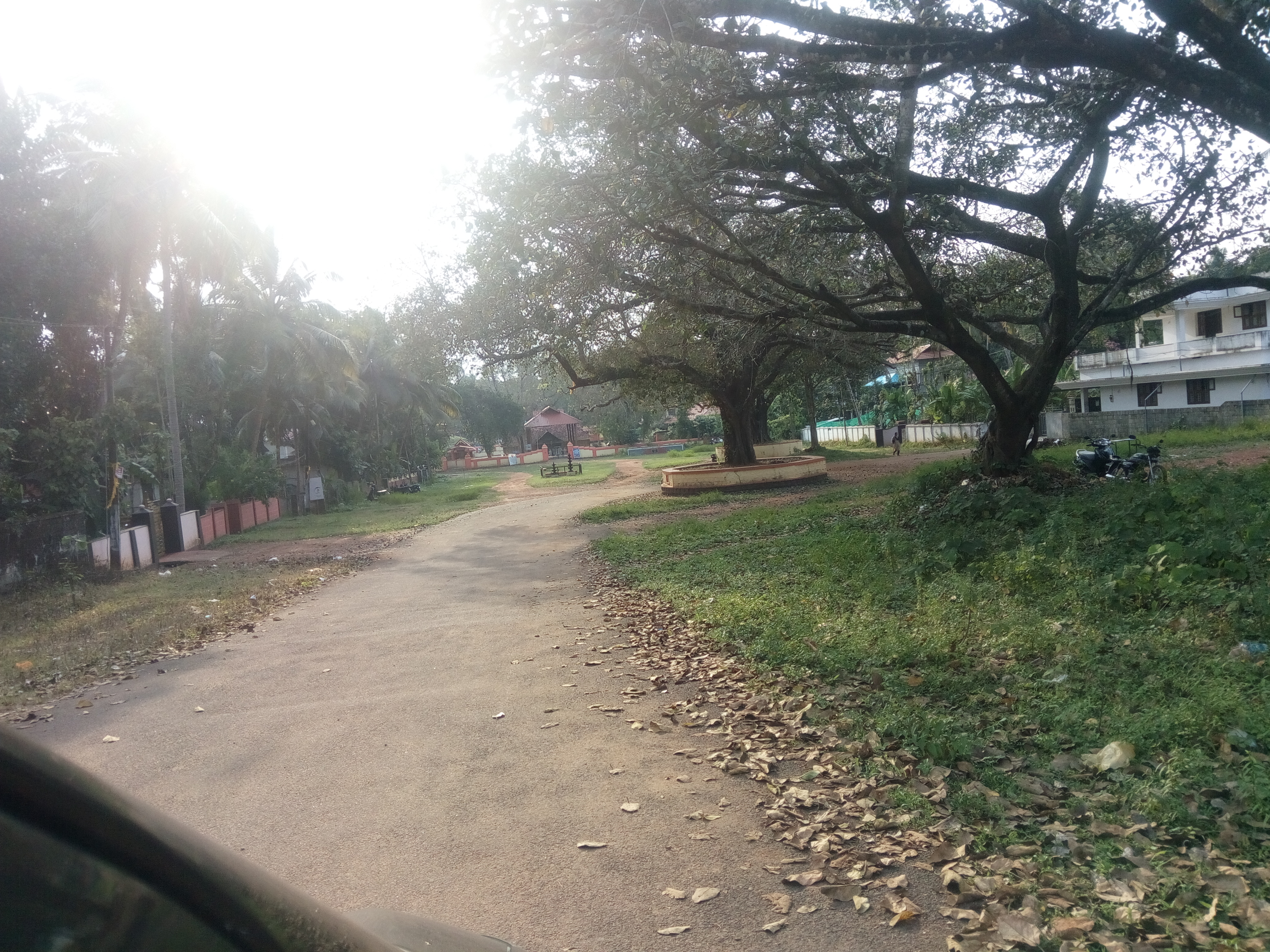
Temple Compound

== See also ==
- Temples of Kerala
