= Malayalam calendar =

Sidereal solar calendar used by the Malayali people

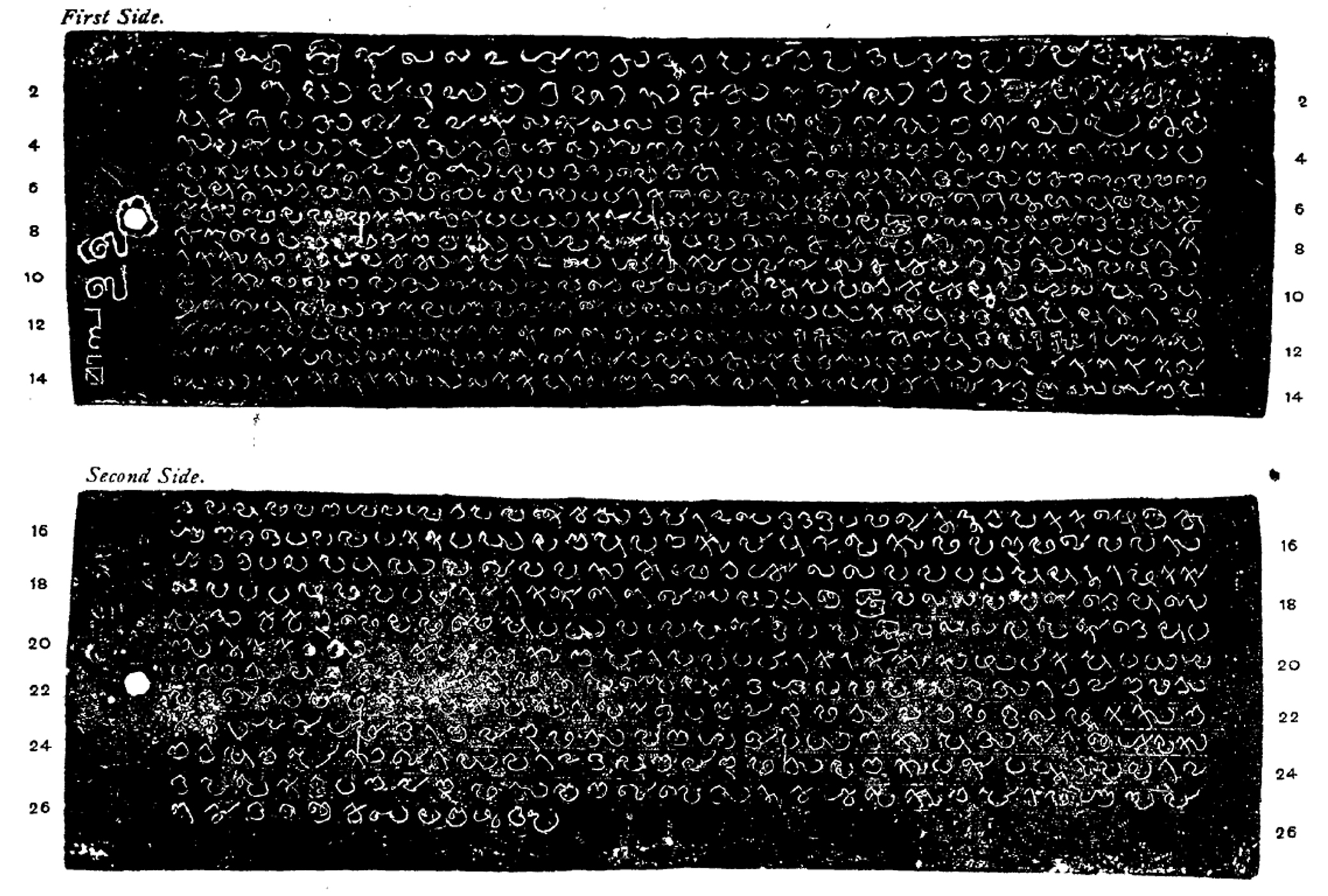
Mampalli copper plate (10th century CE), the earliest record to mention the Kollam Era

The Malayalam Calendar, or the Kollam Era (Malayalam: കൊല്ലവർഷം, romanized: Kollavaṟṣaṁ), is a sidereal solar calendar used in Kerala. The origin of the calendar has been dated to 825 CE, commemorating the establishment of Kollam.

There are many theories regarding the origin of the era, but according to recent scholarship, it commemorated the foundation of Kollam by Maruwan Sapir Iso, who was the leader of Persian Christian Settlers and trading guilds Manigramam and Anjuvannam following the liberation of the Kingdom of Venad from the Chola rule by or with the assistance of the Chera emperor at Kodungallur. The Kollam Syrian copper plates were grants and privileges given to the trading guilds involved in the establishment of Kollam by Sthanu Ravi Varma.

Kollam was the capital of Venadu and an important port town of the Chera Kingdom in that period. Kollam Aandu was adapted in the entire Chera Kingdom (the contemporary states of Tamil Nadu, Karnataka, and Kerala), the majority of which is now in Kerala. In Malayalam-speaking Kerala, it is now called the Malayalam Era or 'Kollavarsham’ (Kollam Thontri Aandu). The earliest available record mentioning the Kollam Era is a royal decree by Sri Vallavan Goda, the King of Venadu, dated to c. 973 CE (Kollam Era 149). In the inscription, the phrase "Kollam Thontri Aandu" is employed. Another era, referred to as "Kollam Aḻintha Aandu", counting from 1097 CE, was reckoned by the Cholas for some time. It is tentatively calculated that the Chola overlords captured the port of Kollam in 1097 CE.

== History ==
The origin of the Kollam Era has been dated to 825 CE, when the great convention in Kollam was held at the behest of King Kulashekharan. Kollam was an important town in that period, and the Malayalam Era is called 'Kollavarsham'.

There are multiple conflicting accounts regarding the origins of the Malayalam calendar, some of which are mentioned below:

- According to legend, Kollam era is attributed to the legend of the hero Paraśurāma, an avatar (incarnation) of the god Vishnu. It is sometimes divided into cycles of 1,000 years reckoned from 1176 BCE. Thus, 825 CE would have been the first year of the era's third millennium.
- The news of the physical disappearance of Sri Adi Shankaracharya in 820 CE at Kedarnath reached Kerala only a few years later. It is believed that Kerala began the Malayalam era, also called the Kollam era, in 825 CE in his memory.
- According to Hermann Gundert, Kollavarsham started as part of erecting a new Shiva Temple in Kollam and because of the strictly local and religious background, the other regions did not follow this system at first. Once Kollam port emerged as an important trade center, however, the other countries also started to follow the new system of calendar. This theory backs the remarks of Ibn Battuta as well.
- It is also believed that the era started as part of erection of the Thirupalkadal Sreekrishnaswamy Temple, family temple of Venad located at Keezhperoor or Kil-perur. Keezhperoor is a place located near Kilimanoor, which is used as prefix along with name of Venad and Travancore monarchs and is believed to be the maternal home of Kulasekhara Alvar.

== Months ==
Comparative table showing corresponding months of other calendars
No.	Months in Malayalam Era	In Malayalam	Tamil calendar	Sanskrit solar month	Saka era	Tulu calendar	Sign of zodiac	Gregorian Calendar
1.	ciṅṅam	ചിങ്ങം	Aavani	Siṃha	Śravana–Bhādrapada	Sona	Leo	August–September
2.	kaṉṉi	കന്നി	Purattasi	Kanyā	Bhādrapada–Aśvina	Nirnaala	Virgo	September–October
3.	tulām	തുലാം	Aippasi	Tulā	Aśvina–Kārtika	Bonthyel	Libra	October–November
4.	vr̥ścikam	വൃശ്ചികം	Karthigai	Vṛścikam	Kārtika–Mārgaśīrṣa	Jaarde	Scorpio	November–December
5.	dhaṉu	ധനു	Margazhi	Dhanu	Mārgaśīrṣa–Pauṣa	Peraarde	Sagittarius	December–January
6.	makaram	മകരം	Thai	Makara	Pauṣa/Taiṣya-Māgha	Ponny	Capricorn	January–February
7.	kumbham	കുംഭം	Maasi	Kumbha	Māgha–Phālguna	Maayi	Aquarius	February–March
8.	mīṉam	മീനം	Panguni	Mīna	Phālguna–Chaitra	Suggy	Pisces	March–April
9.	mēṭam	മേടം	Chithirai	Meṣa	Chaitra– Vaiśākha	Paggu	Aries	April–May
10.	iṭavam	ഇടവം	Vaikasi	Vṛṣabha	Vaiśākha–Jyaiṣṭha	Besa	Taurus	May–June
11.	mithuṉam	മിഥുനം	Aani	Mithuna	Jyaiṣṭha–Āṣāḍha	Kaarthel	Gemini	June–July
12.	kaṟkkaṭakam	കർക്കടകം	Aadi	Karkaṭaka	Āṣāḍha–Śrāvaṇa	Aaty	Cancer	July–August

== Days ==
The days of the week in the Malayalam calendar are suffixed with Aazhcha (ആഴ്ച), meaning week.

Comparative table showing corresponding weekdays
No.	Romanised	മലയാളം	Sanskrit	English	Kannada	Tamil	Hindi	Arabic	Punjabi
1.	ñāyaṟ	ഞായർ	Bhānu vāsara	Sunday	Bhānu vāra	Nyaayiru (ஞாயிறு)	Ravivaar/Itvaar (रविवार/इतवार)	al-aḥad	Ravivaar/Aitvaar (ਰਵਿਵਾਰ/ਐਤਵਾਰ)
2.	tiṅgaḷ	തിങ്കൾ	Sōma vāsara	Monday	Sōma vāra	Thingal (திங்கள்)	Somvaar (सोमवार)	al-ithnayn	Somvaar (ਸੋਮਵਾਰ)
3.	čovva	ചൊവ്വ	Maṅgal̥a vāsara	Tuesday	Maṅgal̥a vāra	Chevvai (செவ்வாய்)	Mangalvaar (मङ्गलवार)	al-thalāthāʾ	Mangalvaar (ਮੰਗਲਵਾਰ)
4.	budhaṉ	ബുധൻ	Budha vāsara	Wednesday	Budha vāra	Budhan (புதன்)	Budhvaar (बुधवार)	al-arbaʿā	Budhvaar (ਬੁਧਵਾਰ)
5.	vyāḻam	വ്യാഴം	Guru vāsara	Thursday	Guru vāra	Vyazhan (வியாழன்)	Guruvaar/Brihaspativaar (गुरूवार/बृहस्पतिवार)	al-khamīs	Guruvaar/Veervaar (ਗੁਰੂਵਾਰ/ਵੀਰਵਾਰ)
6.	veḷḷi	വെള്ളി	Śukra vāsara	Friday	Śukra vāra	Velli (வெள்ளி)	Shukravaar (शुक्रवार)	al-jumuʿah	Shukarvaar (ਸ਼ੁਕਰਵਾਰ)
7.	śaṉi	ശനി	Śani vāsara	Saturday	Śani vāra	Sani (சனி)	Shanivaar (शनिवार)	al-sabt	Shanivaar (ਸ਼ਨੀਵਾਰ)

Like the months above, there are twenty seven stars starting from Aswati (Ashvinī in Sanskrit) and ending in Revatī. The 365 days of the year are divided into groups of fourteen days called Ñattuvela (ഞാറ്റുവേല), each one bearing the name of a star.

== Significant dates ==
- Vishu (1st day of Medam month): Malayali New Year (traditional)
- Pathamudayam (10th day of Medam month)
- Ramayana Masam (whole month of Karkidakam)
- Karkidaka Vavu (month of Karkidakam): Rituals performed to honour ancestors
- Chingam Onnu: Malayali New Year (as per the Kollam Era calendar)
- Onam (month of Chingam): Annual Harvest and Cultural Festival
- Vinayaka Chaturthi (month of Chingam): Birth of Lord Ganesha
- Sri Krishna Janmashtami (month of Chingam): Birth of Lord Krishna
- Navaratri (month of Kanya): Saraswati Puja and Vidyarambham
- Deepavali (month of Thulam): Festival of Lights
- Guruvayur Ekadashi (month of Vrishchikam): Festival related to Guruvayur Temple
- Thrikarthika (month of Vrishchikam): Festival of Lights
- Thiruvathira (month of Dhanu): Nakshatra (Star) of Lord Shiva
- Makaravilakku (1st day of Makaram month): Festival related to Sabarimala Temple
- Makara Bharani (month of Makaram): Festival related to Devi
- Thaipooyam (month of Makaram): Festival related to Lord Murugan
- Maha Shivaratri (month of Kumbham): Festival related to Lord Shiva

Vishu (വിഷു), celebrated on the first day of Medam, Onam (ഓണം), celebrated on the star Thiruvonam [t̪iruʋoːɳəm] on the first day of Chingam, and Deepavali (ദീപാവലി), celebrated on the first day of Thulam, are three of the major festivals. The first day of Chingam is celebrated as the Kerala New Year, replacing Vishu (വിഷു), which was considered the beginning of a year until 825 CE. Vishu is still celebrated as the traditional Malayali New Year, as it is astronomically significant, 'Medam' being the first among the 12 rashis (the zodiac signs corresponding to the 12 months of a solar year).. Deepavali is traditionally celebrated during Thulam which is the months of October and November.

The Makaravilakku festival is celebrated in the Ayyappa Temple at Sabarimala on the first day of Makaram month. This marks the grand finale of the two-month period to the Sabarimala pilgrimage. The 1st of Makaram marks the winter Solstice (Uttarayanam) and the 1st of Karkaṭakam marks the summer solstice (Dakshinayanam) according to the Malayalam calendar (according to the astronomical calendar, the summer solstice is on 21 June, and the winter solstice on 21 December).

Chaitram 1 (usually coinciding with 20 March) or Medam 1 (mostly coinciding with 14 April, for 2019 it was on 15 April), both in the proximity of the date of the vernal equinox (21 March), mark the beginning of the new year in many traditional Indian calendars such as the Indian national calendar and the Tamil calendar. When the Government of Kerala adopted Kolla Varsham as the regional calendar, the first of Chingam, the month of the festival of Onam, was accepted as the Malayalam New Year instead.

== Derived names ==
Many events in Kerala are related to the dates in the Malayalam calendar.

The agricultural activities of Kerala are centred on the seasons. The southwest monsoon which starts around 1 June is known as Edavappathi, meaning mid of month Edavam. The northeast monsoon which starts during mid October is called thulavarsham (rain in the month of thulam). The two harvests of paddy are called Kannikkoythu and Makarakkoythu (harvests in the months kanni and makaram, respectively).

== See also ==
- Bengali calendar
- Hindu calendar
- Manipuri calendar
- Tamil calendar
- Vākyapañcāṅga
- Great flood of 99, in Kerala in 1924 CE, or 1099 ME
