= Mulluthara Devi Temple, Malamekkara =

Malamekkara Mulluthara Devi Temple
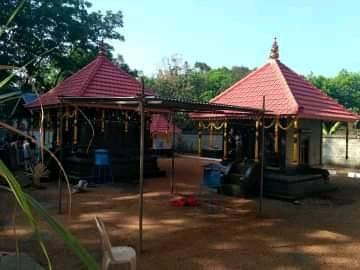

Religion
- Affiliation: Hinduism
- District: Pathanamthitta district
- Deity: Kali
- Festivals: Srattu, Jeevitha Ezhunnullippu, Appindi Vilakku

Location
- Location: Malamekkara
- State: Kerala
- Country: India

Architecture
- Type: Kerala

The Malayalam Multicellular Devi Temple is a Hindu temple located in Malamekkara, Pathanamthitta district, Kerala, India.

== Legend ==
Throughout history, the temple has been used as a training center for Kalari and has been home to Kaniyars who taught Ezhuthu Kalari, Ayurveda, and Astrology. The main ritual of the temple is Kuthiyottam, a dance form created to commemorate the triumph of the goddess Parashakti over the demon Mahishasura. The dancers are considered to be the injured soldiers of the goddess.

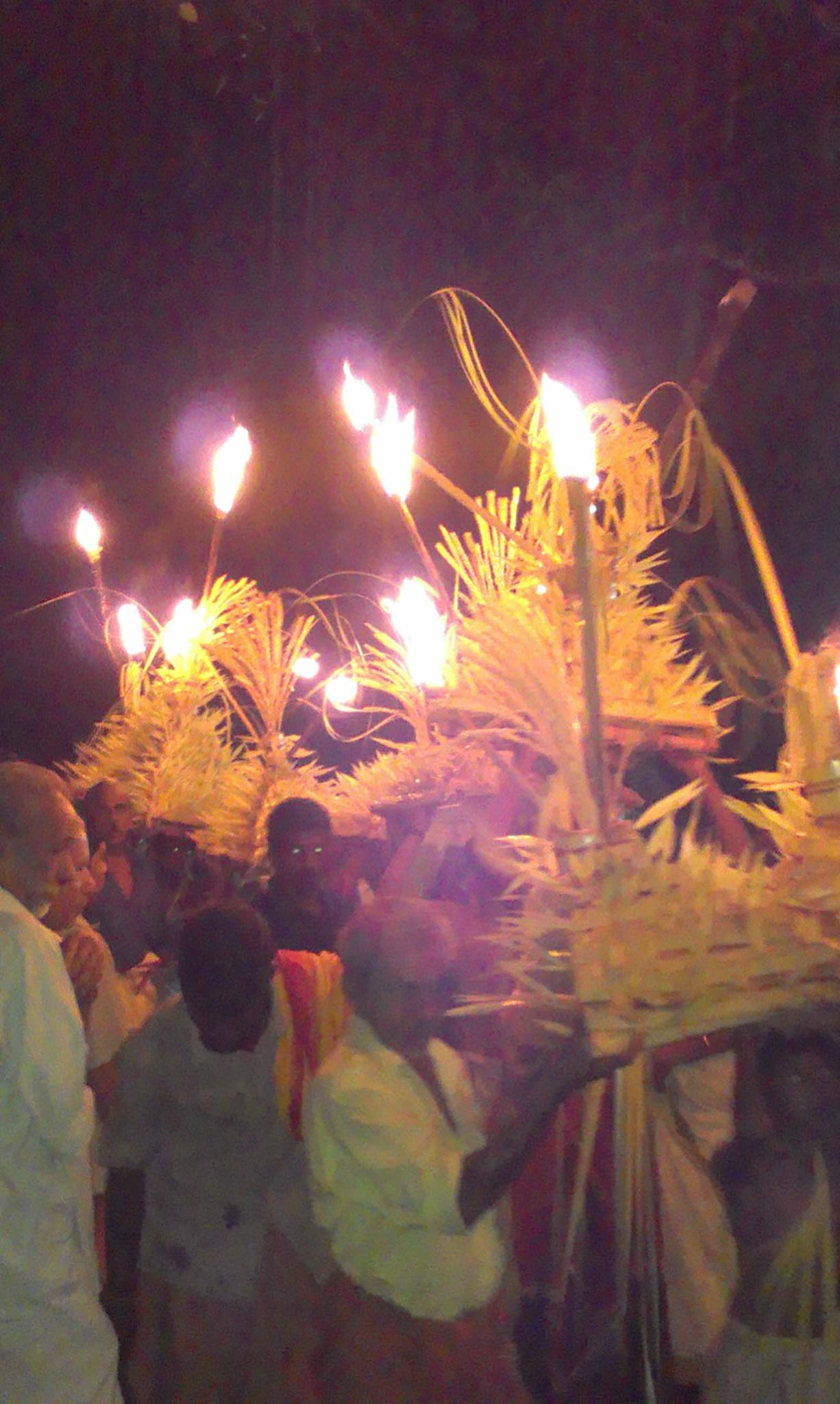
ആപ്പിണ്ടി വിളക്ക്

== Sub Deities ==
- Ganesha
- Brahmarakshasa
- Vetala
- Serpent deities

== Festivals ==
One of the most renowned festivals held at the temple is Jeevitha Ezhunnullippu With Appindi Vilakku, which takes place in the month of Kumbha (late February to early March).

- അത്തം തിരുന്നാൾ മഹോത്സവം.

== In Literature ==
- Mullutharayile Aappindi Vilakku(മുള്ളുതറയിലെ ആപ്പിണ്ടി വിളക്ക്), a poem about Aappindi Vilakku at Mulluthara Devi Temple, written by Sathish Kalathil, Published in Malayala Manorama.
