= Mullakkal =

- town
- Location in Kerala, India Mullakkal (India)
- Coordinates: 9°30′0″N 76°20′30″E
- Country: India
- State: Kerala
- District: Alappuzha
- Talukas: Ambalappuzha

Languages
  - Official: Malayalam, English
- Time zone: UTC+5:30 (IST)
- PIN: 6XXXXX
- Telephone code: 0477
- Vehicle registration: KL-04

Mullakkal is an area in Alappuzha district in the state of Kerala, India. It is part of Alappuzha municipality. This is the main town center of the Alleppey town.

The Mullakkal Rajarajeswari Temple is a Hindu temple in Alappuzha, Kerala, India. The temple is also known as the Mullakkal Bhagwati Temple. The temple was designed and built in the old Kerala style. The temple grounds is filled with jasmine plants, after which the place may have been named, since 'mullai' in Tamil and 'mulla' in Malayalam mean jasmine. There are several stories related to the origin of the temple and its foundation. The idol in the inner shrine is that of the goddess Durga. The temple is run by the Travancore Devaswom Board.
