= Keezhperoor =

- Village
- Interactive map of Keezhperoor
- Coordinates: 8.775004°N 76.840251°E
- Country: India
- State: Kerala
- District: Thiruvananthapuram

Government
  - Type: Local Self Government
  - Body: Nagaroor grama panchayat

Area
  - Total: 3 km^{2} (1.2 sq mi)

Population (2011)
  - Total: 1,500
  - Density: 500/km^{2} (1,300/sq mi)

Languages
  - Official: Malayalam, English
- Time zone: UTC+5:30 (IST)
- PIN: 695601
- Telephone code: 0470
- Vehicle registration: KL 16
- Civic agency: Nagaroor Panchayath
- The details are for Nagaroor Panchayath Town

Keezhperoor (kīḻpērūr, Kilapperur, Kizhperur) or Kupaka is a village located 6 kilometers from Kilimanoor in Thiruvananthapuram district of Kerala. It houses Thirupalkadal Sreekrishnaswamy Temple, family temple of Venad, Kizhakkumkara Devi Temple, and Thekkumkara Mahadeva Temple.

== History ==
Keezhperoor was one of the prominent places of Ay Kingdom and later Venad dynasty. During the Ay period, the place was known as Periyaoor, later divided into Kizhperiyaoor and Melperiyaoor. Thirupalkadal Sreekrishnaswamy Temple was the family temple of Ay kingdom and Venad dynasty which is believed to be 1200 years old. The evidence regarding the existence of Keezhperoor and Thirupalkadal Sreekrishnaswamy Temple is in different copper plates and is available from 843 AD.

== Keezhperoor monarchs of Venad Dynasty (till 16th century) ==
1. Rama Varma Kulashekhara (1090–1102); mentioned in Rameswarathukoil Inscription as the founder of Venad as an independent state.
2. Kotha Varma Marthandam (1102–1125); conquered Kottar and Nanjanad from the Pandya Dynasty.
3. Vira Kerala Varma I (1125–1145); a great religious benefactor, responsible for the rebuilding of Padmanabhaswamy and the endowment of Suchindram Temples.
4. Kodai Kerala Varma (1145–1150)
5. Vira Ravi Varma (1161–1164)
6. Vira Kerala Varma II (1164–1167)
7. Vira Aditya Varma (1167–1173)
8. Vira Udaya Martanda Varma (1173–1192); established his seat at Kulikkod and allied himself to the Pandya Kings.
9. Devadaram Vira Kerala Varma III (1192–1195)
10. Vira Manikantha Rama Varma Tiruvadi (1195–?)
11. Vira Rama Kerala Varma Tiruvadi (1209–1214)
12. Vira Ravi Kerala Varma Tiruvadi (1214–1240)
13. Vira Padmanabha Martanda Varma Tiruvadi (1240–1252); The Pandya kings asserted their dominance over Venad during his reign.
14. Jayasimha Deva (1266–1267); succeeded in bringing the whole of present-day Kerala under his control. He established his seat at Kollam, the surrounding areas becoming known as Jayasimhanad (Desinganad). His wife Rani Umma Devi was probably a joint ruler with her husband. He died leaving several sons who quarrelled with his nephews over the succession, causing a long and disruptive civil war.
15. Ravi Varma (1299–1313)
16. Vira Udaya Martanda Varma (1313–1333)
17. Aditya Varma Tiruvadi (1333–1335)
18. Vira Rama Udaya Martanda Varma Tiruvadi (1335–1342)
19. Vira Kerala Varma Tiruvadi (1342–1350)
20. Vira Eravi Eravi Varma (1350-1376)
21. Sarvamganatha Adhithya Varma (1376–1382)
22. Vira Ravi Varma (1383–1416)
23. Vira Ravi Ravi Varma (1416–1417)
24. Vira Kerala Martanda Varma (1383)
25. Chera Udaya Martanda Varma (1383–1444)
26. Vira Ravi Varma (1444–1458)
27. Sankhara Sri Vira Rama Martanda Varma (1458–1469)
28. Vira Kodai Sri Aditya Varma (1469–1484); established his capital at Kallidaikurichi.
29. Vira Ravi Ravi Varma (1484–1512)
30. Vira Ravi Kerala Varma, Kulasekhara Perumal (1512–1513)
31. Vira Kerala Varma, Kulasekhara Perumal (1513-1516)
32. Bhutala Veera Udaya Marthanda Varma, Kulasekhara Perumal (1516-1535)
33. Bhutala Veera Rama Varma (1535)
34. Bhutala Veera Ravi Varma (1535-1542)
35. Bhutala Veera Adithya Varma (1542-1544)
36. Bhutala Veera Kerala Varma (1544-1545)
37. Vira Udaya Marthanda Varma (1545-1554)
38. Bhutala Veera Ramavarma (1545-1556)
39. Vira Unni Kerala Varma (1556-1568)
40. Vanchi Vira Aditya Varma (1554-1575)
41. Vira Ravi Varma (1575-1578)
42. Vira Udaya Marthanda Varma (1578-1594)
