= Thirupalkadal Sreekrishnaswamy Temple =

Hindu temple in Kerala, India

- Thirupalkadal Sreekrishnaswamy Temple, Keezhperoor, Thiruvananthapuram, Kerala

Religion
- Affiliation: Hinduism
- District: Thiruvananthapuram
- Deity: Krishna (as a four armed Vishnu)
- Festivals: Janmashtami, Medam Utsavam, Ekadasi
- Governing body: No.3200 Ambikavilasam NSS Karayogam

Location
- Location: Keezhperoor
- State: Kerala
- Country: India
- Coordinates: 8.774384°N 76.840324°E

Architecture
- Type: Dravidian architecture
- Completed: Records indicate the temple to be 2000 years old

Specifications
- Temple: One
- Elevation: 57.38 m (188 ft)

Website
- http://www.thirupalkadalsreekrishnatemple.org/

Thirupalkadal Sreekrishna Temple (Thiruparkadal Sreekrishnaswamy Temple) is one of the oldest Hindu temples dedicated to the Hindu God Vishnu (worshipped as Krishna), located in the village Keezhperoor, Chirayinkeezhu Taluk, Thiruvananthapuram in Kerala, India. The central icon is a four-armed standing Vishnu carrying the conch Panchajanya (Turbinella pyrum), the discus Sudarshana Chakra, the mace Kaumodaki and a lotus with a holy basil garland. The principal deity, Krishna (Thirupalkadal Bhattarakar) was the family deity of Ay dynasty. It is believed that Kulashekhara Alvar, considered the seventh in the line of the twelve Alvars, renovated this temple. While it is not mentioned in the 108 Divya Desams, it does find mentioned in the list of Abhimana Kshethrams, as well as in many texts and legends. The history of this temple is closely intertwined with the Cheras' and Cholas' Empires and the Kingdoms of Venad and Travancore.

== History ==
Thirupalkadal Sreekrishnaswamy temple is known as Adikulakovil of Ay kingdom. The temple was constructed by the Ay Kingdom (Kupaka), who were ruling the place with their capital at Keezhperoor, during the only recorded Sangam period. This family was later known as Venad, and then 'Thiruvadi', 'Thiruvithamkur' and eventually Travancore. The temple was renovated in 9th century CE by the Venad King Vallabhan Kotha of Keezhperoor Illam. The Keezhperoor Swaroopam was formed by the merger of the Chera dynasty based at Mahodayapuram with the Ays of Vizhinjam.

== Architecture ==
The temple is constructed in the ancient Dravidian style, with the presence of Brahma and Shiva in the outer wall of circular shaped garbhagriha, which represents the presence of Parabrahma. The roof of the sanctum sanctorum is formed by 36 rafters carved in 12 wooden pieces (of 30 degrees each), representing the 12 rashis which when multiplied by 3 (the number representing the Trimurti) equals 108, which is the number of pithas of Adi Parashakti. It is also believed that the Kollam Era started with the renovation of this temple.

== Administration ==
In 12th century CE, 343 ME the temple administration was handed over to uralar sabha a council consisting of Brahmins and Madambi Nairs in the ratio 8:2 by Sri Vira Udayamarttandavarman Tiruvadi, Ilayaguru of Venad. He also fixed the expenditure of the temple in respect of the conduct of the daily bali-ceremony and other expenses connected with god's worship and yearly festival of the temple.

In 1965, as per the court order, Brahmasree Narayana Narayanaru handed over the administration of the Temple to No.3200 Ambikavilasama Nair Service Society Karayogam of Keezhperoor.

After Independence, when the leasing-subtenants became owners, it adversely affected the temple administration and the priest also stopped worship to deity. In the 1980s, 3200 Ambikavilasam Nss Karayogam got ownership from uralars and started the renovation process of the temple.

== Architecture ==
The temple complex has granite walls enclosing it. Immediately on entering the eastern Nata, on either side a long granite foundation of the structure is visible. On the grounds to the front and right of the Deity and at an elevation, stood a Koothampalam, seemingly of modest measurements. There is an Anakkottil of impressive dimension stands in front of the temple. The principal Belikkallu is situated as usual, in front of the main entrance leading to the inner regions. The belikkapura has long fallen down. The detached pillars of Namaskara Mandapam has wooden pilasters on four sides, so also four stone pillars with two facing the sopanam carrying stone carvings. The square shaped copper tiled roof carries a crest spot on top. The inner ceiling is decorated with wooden houses. The granite sopanam leading to the inner areas connecting the sanctum rise from ground level to the front door in six steps. The balustrades on either side present a lion's head with a long rolled tongue. At the end of it there is a well executed carving of Shiva with Parvati sitting on his lap. It also contains a small Ganesha, Murugam and a reclining Nandi. The balustrade on the opposite side offers the four-armed Vishnu holding the discus, conch, mace, and the lotus. Sreedevi is present on one side of him and Bhudevi on the other. The Sreekovil is circular, copper tiled and in procession of an inner encircling corridor. Mural paintings about Krishna leela used to adorn the walls.

== Sources ==
- Travancore Archaeological Series vol 1 to 7, ISBN 81-86365-73-7
- Keralacharithrathile Iruldanja Edukal, Keralam Anchum Arum Noottandukalil, Chila Kerala Charithra Prasnangal (Part I, II, & III), Cherasamrajyam Ompathum Pathum Noottandukalil by Elamkulam Kunjan Pillai
- Rudrakshamala by Aswathi Thirunal Gowri Lakshmi Bayi published by TBS books ISBN 978-81-300-1547-7, 9788130015477
