= Vettakkorumakan =

Regional Hindu deity

Vettakkoru Makan
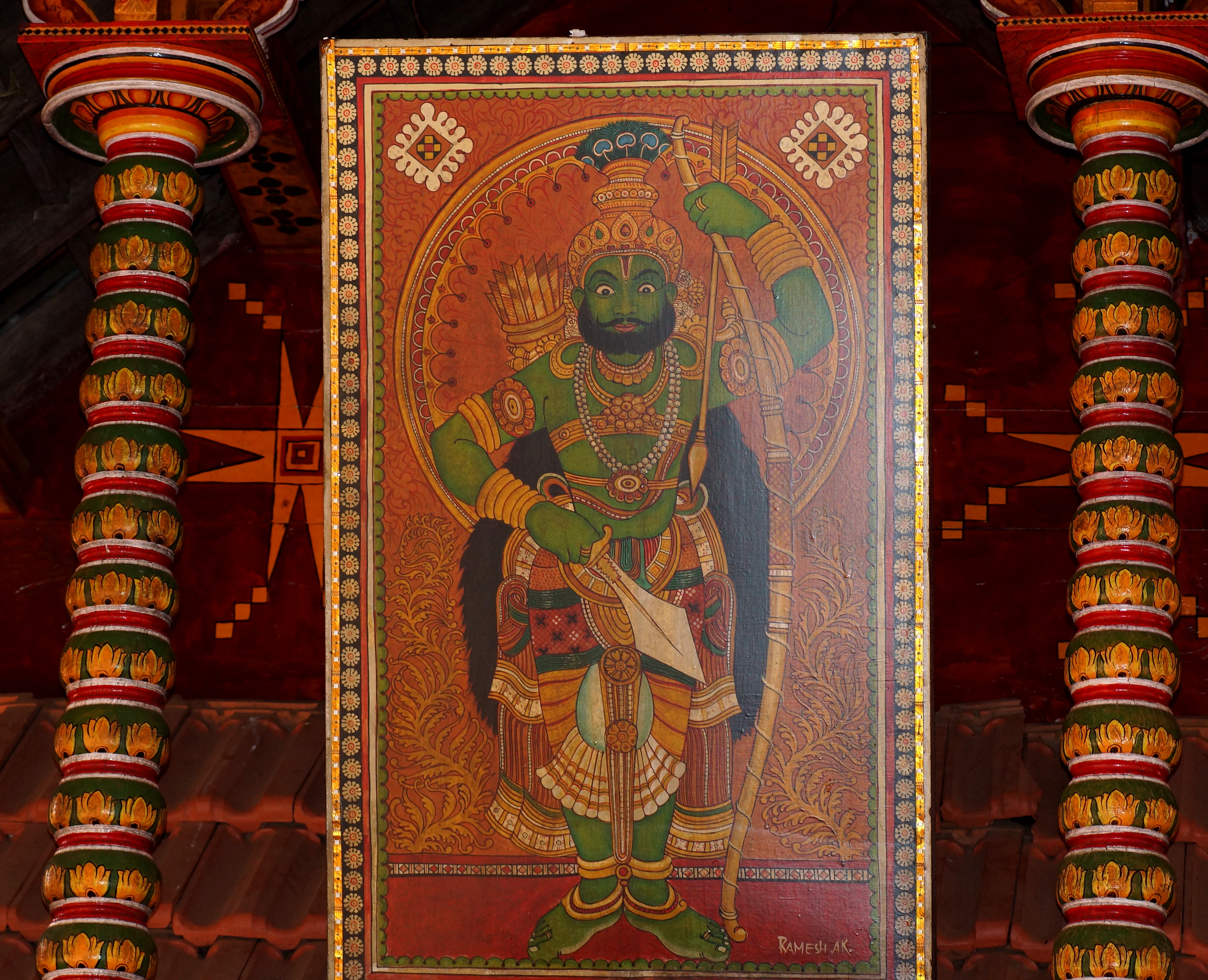
- Malayalam: വേട്ടക്കൊരുമകന്‍
- Affiliation: Son of Shiva
- Weapon: Churika
- Region: Kerala

Vettakkoru Makan (Malayalam: വേട്ടക്കൊരുമകന്‍) is a Hindu deity worshipped in parts of Northern Kerala. This deity is alternately referred as Kiratha-Sunu (son of Kirata) in Sanskrit. Vettakkorumakan is the chief deity of chera kings in Malabar, later after the collapse of chera kingdom the newly formed rulers adopted it. Vettakkorumakan is believed to be the son of Shiva by his consort Parvati, born when he assumed the form of a Kirata (hunter) to deliver a weapon known as Pashupatastra to Arjuna. He is mostly and exclusively worshipped in Malabar region of Kerala. The most famous temple of this deity is the Balussery-Kotta Vettakkorumakan temple about 25 km from Calicut. This was once the fort of the Cheras, prior to Rajas of Kurumbranad.

== Etymology ==
Vettaikkorumakan in (Malayalam: വേട്ടക്കൊരുമകന്‍) supposedly means "a son from a hunt", though grammatically and etymologically it is not acceptable. It is because the word comes from 'Karumakan' (കരുമകന്‍).Therefore, the correct name is 'Vettakkarumakan' (വേട്ടക്കരുമകന്‍). Traditionally, it was a deity of hunting; (vetta, വേട്ട = hunting, in Mal.). The Malayalam-English dictionary of Hermann Gundert too mentions the name Karumakan (കരുമകന്‍). In ancient Kerala, especially in northern Kerala, people who went for hunting used to give oblations (vazhipadu, Mal.) at the shrines of Vettakkarumakan. The Kerala Bhasha Institute has published a well-researched book titled 'Vettakkarumakan' (വേട്ടക്കരുമകന്‍) by Y.V. Kannan. The wrong and illogical transformation of the word to Vettakkorumakan (വേട്ടക്കൊരുമകന്‍) is a relatively new development, probably post-1850s.

== Legend ==
Vettakkorumakan is the son of Shiva and Parvati. When Shiva appeared before Arjuna in the form of a hunter in his Kirata Avatar to grant him His personal weapon, Pasupata, Parvati was also with him dressed as a huntress. After giving Arjuna the Pasupata the divine couple wandered in the forest in the same form for some time. During this period they had a son born of extraordinary effulgence and that is Vettakkorumakan or son born during hunting, to put it roughly. The boy was very mischievous. During his hunting he killed many asuras. But making free use of his bow and arrows he also gave endless trouble to the Devas and Rishis. Unable to bear his mischief they first approached Brahma who expressed his helplessness as the boy was the son of Shiva. Then they besought the help of Shiva himself who however dismissed them by saying that he being a boy would be naturally naughty and he would be all right when he grew up. As a last resort they approached Vishnu who took the form of an old hunter and went to the boy. Vishnu displayed before the boy a golden churika,(dagger-cum-sword) which was so beautiful that it attracted the boy who begged him to make a present of it. Vishnu agreed provided he would behave in a responsible manner by giving up his bow and started protecting the people instead of harming them. The boy accepted the condition and with the churika took leave of his parents from Kailasa and went to the land of Parasurama, Kerala. He crossed several mountains and forests and rivers and reached North Kerala where he first entered the Balussery Fort. Hence the importance of the Balussery temple dedicated to Vettakkorumakan though the Lord later visited other places where He was revered and worshipped. He is the family deity of Kurumbranad Rajas

== See also ==
- Muthappan
- Shiva
