= Kattakampal =

- village
- Location in Kerala, India Kattakampal (India)
- Coordinates: 10°41′0″N 76°2′0″E
- Country: India
- State: Kerala
- District: Thrissur

Government
  - Body: Grama Panchayat

Population (2011)
  - Total: 11,836

Languages
  - Official: Malayalam, English
- Time zone: UTC+5:30 (IST)
- PIN: 680544
- Vehicle registration: KL-48

Kattakampal is a village in Thrissur in the state of Kerala, India. It is famous for Pooram which is an annual festival of Kattakampal Temple. It is located about 30 km from Thrissur, 8 km from Kunnamkulam and 12 km from Guruvayoor.

== Demographics ==
As of 2011 India census, Kattakampal had a population of 11836 with 5419 males and 6,417 females.

== Related Links ==
• Kattakampal Temple
