= Simhadri =

Simhadri may refer to:

- Simhadri or Simhachalam, a temple and town in Andhra Pradesh India, considered an abode of the god Vishnu
  - Simhachalam Hill Range, the hill range containing the town
  - Simhachalam bus station
  - Simhachalam railway station
  - Simhadri Express, an Indian passenger train

== Arts and entertainment ==
Films

- Simhadri (1996 film), a 1996 Kannada film directed by Raj Kishor
- Simhadriya Simha, a 2002 Kannada film
- Simhadri (2003 film), a 2003 Telugu film directed by S. S. Rajamouli
- Simhachalam (film), a 2003 Telugu film
- Simhadri (2014 film), a 2014 Kannada film directed by Shivamani

Others

- Simhadri Narasimha Satakam, a poetry collection written Gogulapati Kurmanatha Kavi

== People ==
- Aryan Simhadri (born 2006), American actor
- Simhadri Satyanarayana Rao, an Indian politician
- Y. C. Simhadri, former Vice Chancellor of Andhra University

== Other uses ==
- Simhadripuram, a village and a mandal in Kadapa district in the state of Andhra Pradesh, India
- Simhadri Super Thermal Power Plant, a coal-fired thermal power plant located south of Visakhapatnam city, in Andhra Pradesh
