= Hanuman Jayanti =

Hindu festival associated with Hanuman

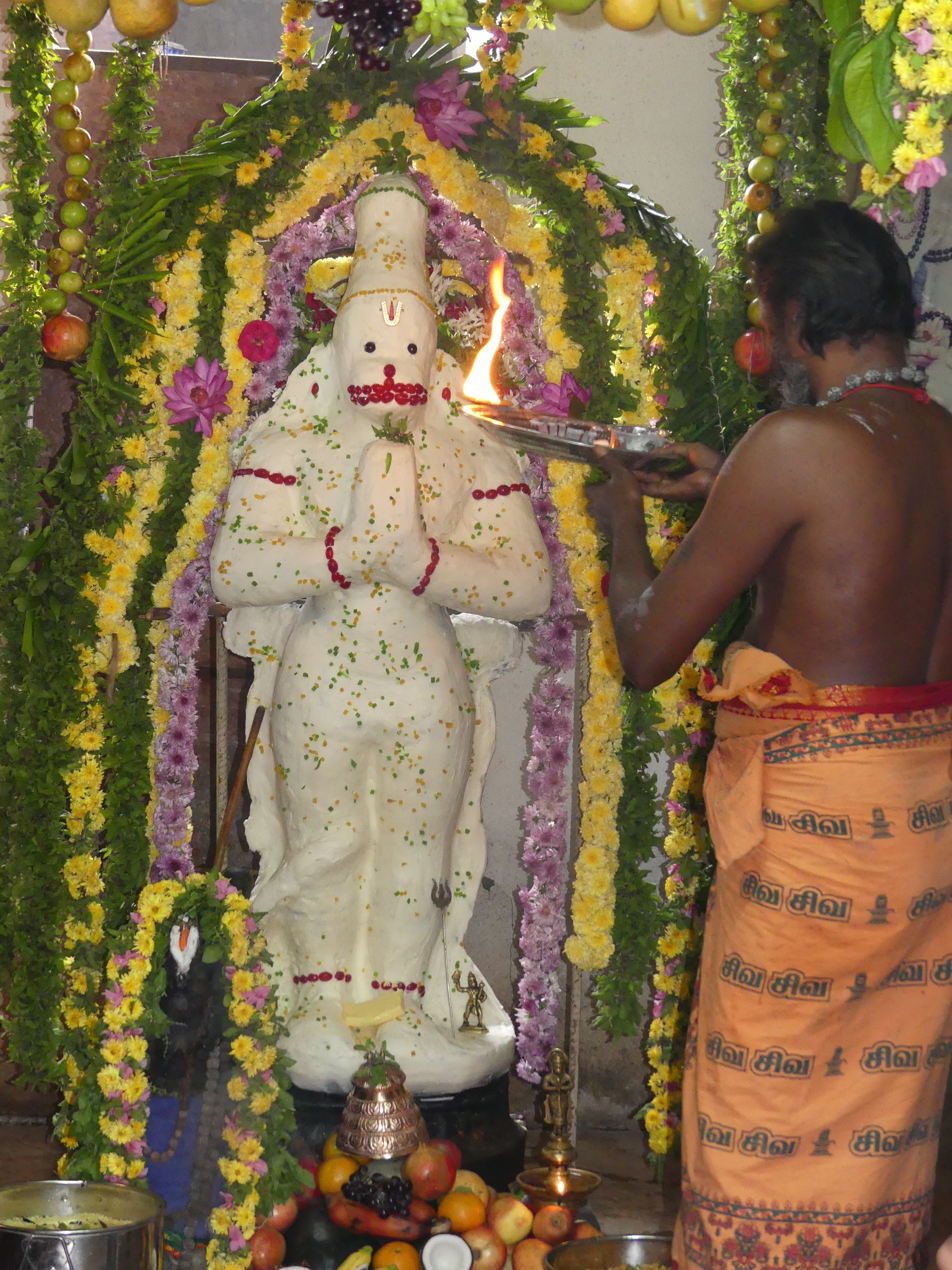
- Murti of Hanuman worshipped on Hanuman Jayanti
- Observed by: Hindus
- Type: Religious
- Significance: Commemoration of the birth of Hanuman
- Observances: Visiting temples, offerings, charity, recitation of the Hanuman Chalisa and the Ramayana and its other versions
- 2026 date: Most regions 02 April; Odia date 14 April; Telugu date 12 May; Kannada date 3 December (Eastern hemisphere); 2 December (Western hemisphere); Tamil and Malayali date 19 December
- Frequency: Annual
- Related to: Rama Navami, Chaitra Navaratri

Hanuman Janmotsava (Sanskrit: हनुमानजन्मोत्सव, romanized: Hanumānajanmotsav), also called Hanuman Jayanti, is a Hindu festival celebrating the birth of the Hindu deity Hanuman, one of the protagonists of the Ramayana and its many versions. Hanuman is regarded to be an ardent devotee of Rama, and is widely known for his unflinching devotion. He is revered as a symbol of strength.

The celebration of Hanuman Janmotsava varies by time and tradition in each state of India. In most northern states of India, the festival is observed on the full-moon day of the Hindu month of Chaitra (Chaitra Purnima). In Telugu states, it is celebrated on Bahula (Shukla Paksha) Dashami in Vaishakha month according to Telugu calendar. In Karnataka, it is observed on Shukla Paksha Trayodashi, during the Margashirsha month or in Vaishakha, while in Kerala and Tamil Nadu, it is celebrated during the month of Dhanu (called Margazhi in Tamil). It s observed on Pana Sankranti in the eastern state of Odisha, which coincides with the Odia New Year.

== Birth ==
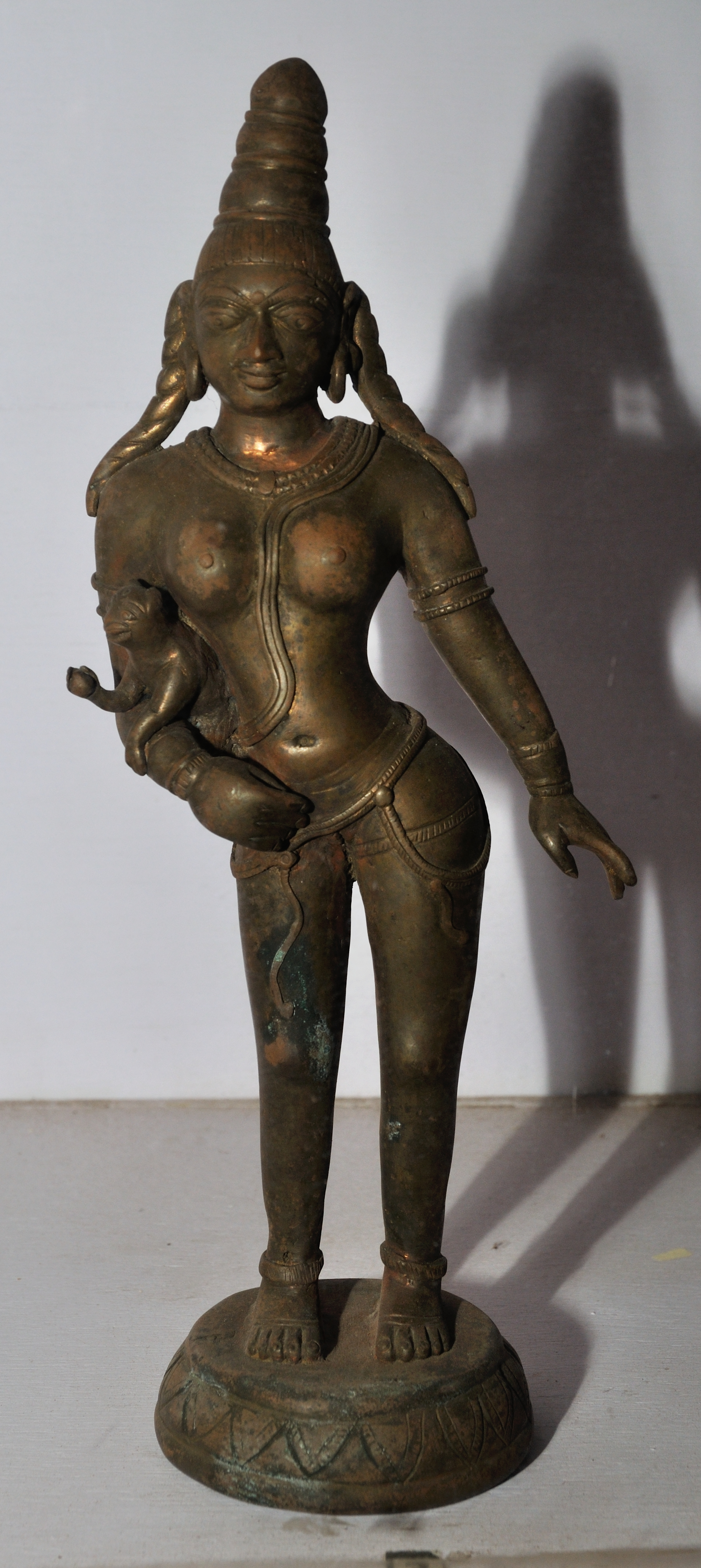
Anjani (Anjana) with Child Hanuman - Bronze, Pallava Period, Mathura government museum, India

Hanuman is a vanara, born to Kesari and Anjana. He is also known as the celestial son of Vayu, the wind-god. His mother, Anjana, was an apsara who was born on earth due to a curse. She was redeemed from this curse upon giving birth to a son.

Several accounts Hanuman's birth are described in different Hindu texts. The Varaha Purana and Brahmanda Purana mention that shortly after the birth of Hanuman, he leapt toward the Sun, mistaking it for a fruit. The place from where he made the jump was Venkatagiri. After Lord Brahma and Lord Indra attacked him with their weapons, he fell down and Anjana Devi started crying for her son. To pacify her, the gods descended on Venkatachalam and bestowed several boons on Hanuman and said the place would be called Anjanadri Hill. That's why in seven hills Thirumala one hill got Anjanadri.

=== Kannada origin story (Hampi) ===
The Valmiki Ramayana states that his father, Kesari, was the son of Brihaspati, the king of a region named Sumeru, located near the kingdom of Kishkindha near Hampi in present-day Vijayanagara district of Karnataka. Anjana is said to have performed intense prayers lasting twelve years to Shiva to bear a child. Pleased with their devotion, Shiva granted them the son they sought.

Eknath's Bhavartha Ramayana states that when Anjana was worshiping Rudra, King Dasharatha of Ayodhya was also performing the ritual of Putrakameshti under the guidance of Sage R̥śyaśr̥ṅga in order to have children. As a result, he received some payasam (Indian pudding) to be shared by his three wives, leading to the births of Rama, Lakshmana, Bharata, and Shatrughna. By divine ordinance, a kite (bird) snatched a fragment of that pudding and dropped it while flying over the forest where Anjana was engaged in worship. Vayu, delivered the falling pudding to the outstretched hands of Anjana, who consumed it. Hanuman was born to her as a result.

== Worship ==
Hanuman is worshipped as a deity with the ability to gain victory over evil and provide protection. On this festival, devotees of Hanuman celebrate him and seek his protection, courage, fearlessness and blessings. They join in temples to worship him and present religious offerings. In return, the devotees receive prasadam. People who revere him read from Hindu texts like the Hanuman Chalisa and Ramayana. Devotees visit temples and apply a vermillion to their foreheads from Hanuman's murti. According to legend, when Hanuman found Sita applying sinduram to her forehead, he enquired about this custom. She replied that doing so would ensure a long life for her husband, Rama. Hanuman then proceeded to smear his entire body with vermillion, thus ensuring Rama's immortality.

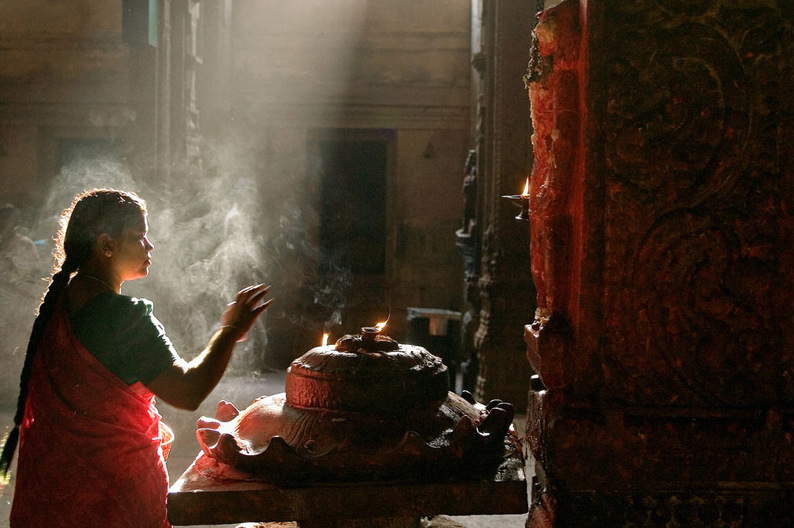
A woman praying to Hanuman, at Meenakshi Amman Temple in Madurai, India

In Tamil Nadu and Kerala, Hanuman Jayanti is celebrated on the new moon day in Margali (Dhanu) month. Famous Hanuman temples in these states like Nanganallur, Namakkal, Suchindram, Thrikkaviyoor and Alathiyoor celebrate this day with pomp.

In Telangana and Andhra Pradesh, Hanuman Jayanti is celebrated for 41 days, beginning on Chaitra Purnima, and concluding on the tenth day during Krishna Paksha in Vaishaka.

In Maharashtra, Hanuman Jayanti is celebrated on the full moon day (pūrnima) of the Hindu lunar month of Chaitra. A special feature of Hanuman Jayanti is that according to some religious almanacs (panchāngs) the birthday of Hanuman falls on the fourteenth day (chaturdashi) in the dark fortnight of the month of Ashvin, while according to others it falls on the full moon day in the bright fortnight of Chaitra. On this day in a Hanuman temple, spiritual discourses begin at dawn since Hanuman is believed to have been born during sunrise. During the time frame of birth, the spiritual discourse are halted and the offering of food (prasadam) is distributed to everyone. Spiritual discourses are organised in most of the Hindu temples of the region on this day.

In Odisha, Pana Sankranti (April 13/14/15) is believed to be the birthday of Hanuman. Devotees visit temples and chant the Hanuman Chalisa throughout the day. Reading the Sundara Kanda book of the Ramayana on this day is also said to be a pious exercise. The day also marks the beginning of the New Year in the traditional Odia Solar Calendar. The festival occurs in the solar Odia calendar (the lunisolar Hindu calendar followed in Odisha) on the first day of the traditional solar month of Meṣa.

== See also ==
- Narasimha Jayanti
- Rama Navami
- Krishna Janmashtami
- Anjaneya Temple, Nanganallur
