= Krishnamacharyulu =

Krishnamacharyulu is a masculine given name:

- Daasarathi Krishnamacharyulu, Telugu poet.
- Nallan Chakravartula Krishnamacharyulu, a scholar, musician, teacher and exponent of the art of harikatha.
- Sri Kantha Krishnamacharyulu or Krishnamayya (12th-13th century CE) was the official songmaster, poet and bard of the Simhachalam Temple, in Visakhapatnam.
