= Vaikasi =

- Native name: Vaikāsi
- Calendar: Tamil calendar
- Month number: 2
- Number of days: 31 or 32
- Season: Ila-venil (Spring)
- Gregorian equivalent: May–June
- Significant days: Vaikasi Visakam

Vaikasi is the second month of the Tamil calendar. The name of the month is derived from the position of the Moon near the Vaisakha nakshatra (star) on the pournami (full moon) day. The month corresponds to ila-venil (spring) season, and falls in May–June in the Gregorian calendar.

In the Hindu lunar calendar, it corresponds to the second month of Vaishakha, falling in the Gregorian months of April–May.

In the Hindu solar calendar, it corresponds to the second month of Vṛṣabha and begins with the Sun's entry into Taurus.

In the Vaishnav calendar, it corresponds to the second month of Madhusudanah.

== Festivals ==
Vaikasi Visakam commemorates the birth of Hindu god Murugan. It falls on the day the Moon transits the Visaka nakshatram in the month of Vaikasi.

== See also ==
- Astronomical basis of the Hindu calendar
- Hindu astronomy
