= Vaishakha =

Month in Hindu calendar

- Native name: वैशाख (Sanskrit)
- Calendar: Hindu calendar
- Month number: 2
- Number of days: 29 or 30
- Season: Vasanta (spring)
- Gregorian equivalent: April–May
- Significant days: Akshaya Tritiya; Buddha Purnima; Narasimha Jayanti; Pohela Boishakh; Vaikasi Visakam; Vaisakhi

Vaishakha (Sanskrit: वैशाख, IAST: Vaiśākha) is the second month of the Hindu lunar calendar and the Indian national calendar. The name of the month is derived from the position of the Moon near the Vishākhā nakshatra (star) on the full moon day. It corresponds to April–May in the Gregorian calendar. The month corresponds to the end of the spring (Vasanta) season and falls in April–May of the Gregorian calendar.

In the Hindu solar calendar, it corresponds to the month of Mesha and begins with the Sun's entry into Aries. It corresponds to Boishakh, the first month in the Bengali calendar. In the Tamil calendar, it corresponds to the third month of Vaikasi, falling in the Gregorian months of May–June. In the Vaishnav calendar, it corresponds to the third month of Madhusudanah.

In the Hindu lunar calendar, each month has 29 or 30 days. The month begins on the next day after Amavasya (new moon) or Purnima (full moon) as per amanta and purnimanta systems respectively. A month consists of two cycles of 15 days each, Shukla Paksha (waxing moon) and Krishna Paksha (waning moon). Days in each cycle are labeled as a thithi, with each thithi repeating twice in a month.

The month marks the start of summer, and the afternoon storms in the month are called kalboishakhi. The storms usually start with strong gusts from the north-western direction at the end of a hot day.

== Festivals ==
The first day of the month is celebrated as the Pohela Boishakh or New Year's Day in Bengal region. In Mithila region, it is celebrated as the Jur Sital (Mithila New Year's Day). The day is observed with cultural programs, festivals and carnivals, and often marks the start of business activities for a new fiscal account. The harvest festival of Vaisakhi is celebrated on in this month which also marks the Punjabi new year according to the Punjabi calendar.

Akshaya Tritiya is an annual spring festival that falls on the third tithi (lunar day) of the bright half (Shukla Paksha) of the month. Buddha Purnima or Vesākha commemorates the birth anniversary of Siddhartha Gautama.

Vaikasi Visakam commemorates the birth of Hindu war god Kartikeya. Narasimha Jayanti is celebrated on Chaturdashi thithi in Narasimha temples such as Simhachalam. Sukla Panchami is celebrated as the birthday of Hindu philosopher Adi Shankara.

== See also ==
- Astronomical basis of the Hindu calendar
- Besakih Temple
- Hindu astronomy
- Hindu units of measurement
- Jyotish
