= Anjaneya Temple, Nanganallur =

Hindu temple

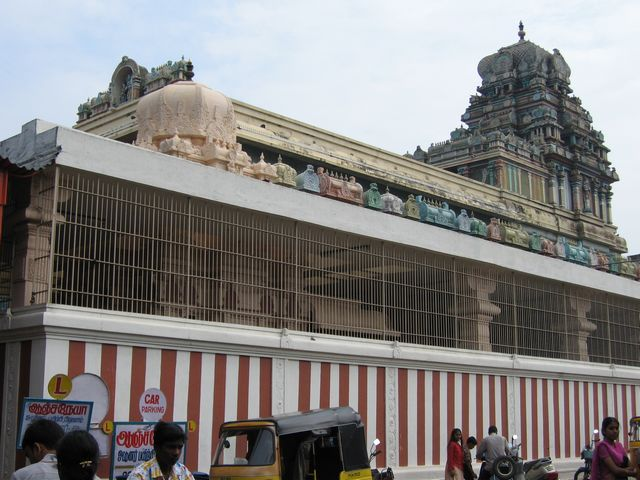

- Location in Tamil Nadu

Religion
- Affiliation: Hinduism
- District: Chennai
- Deity: Hanuman
- Festivals: Hanumath Jayanthi, Gokulashtami, Sri Rama Navami
- Governing body: Hindu Religious & Charitable Endowments Department

Location
- Location: Nanganallur
- State: Tamil Nadu
- Country: India
- Interactive map of Anjaneya Temple, Nanganallur
- Coordinates: 12.986276°N 80.194308°E

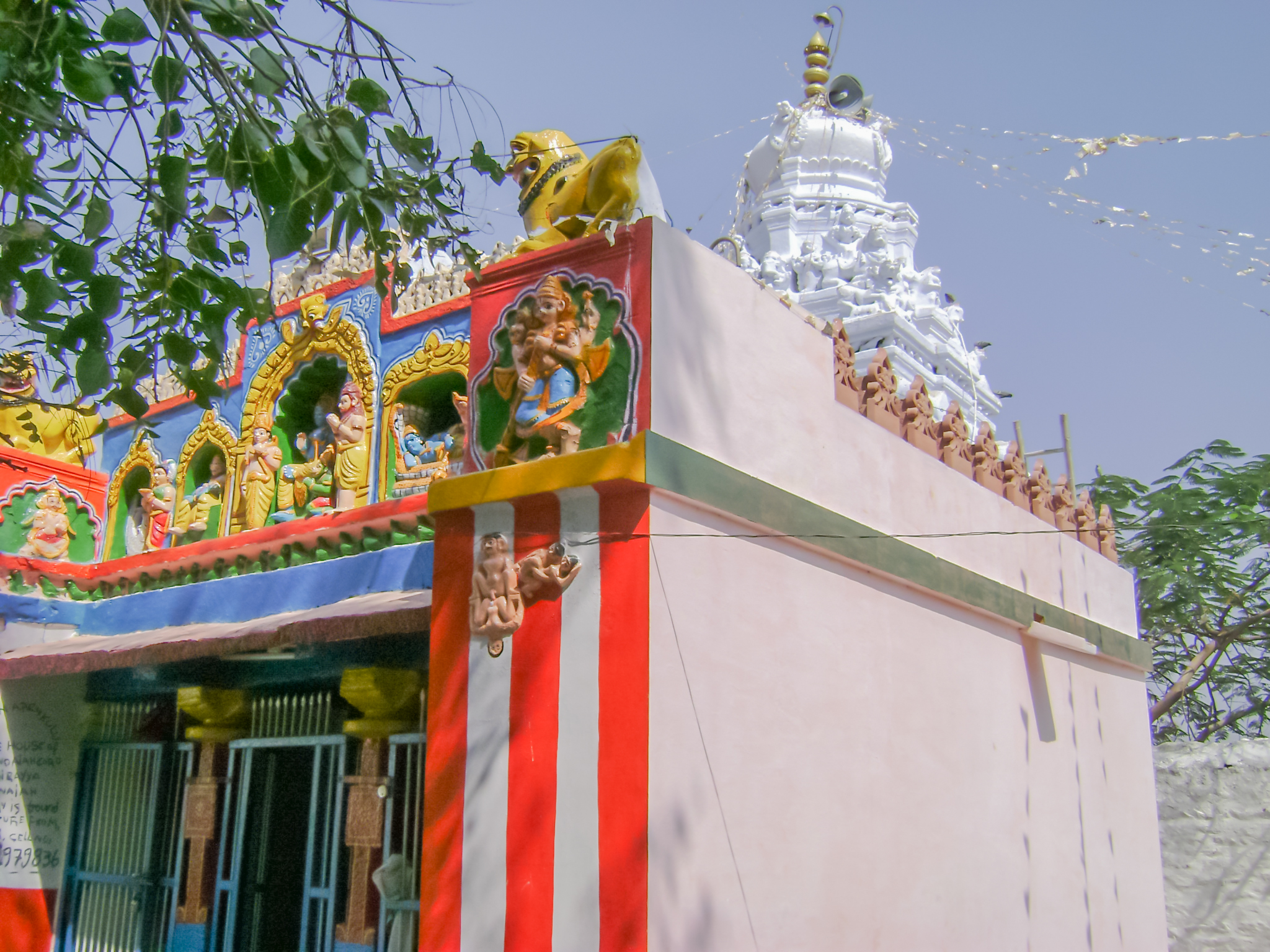
View from the side of the temple

The Anjaneya Temple at Nanganallur, Chennai is a Hindu temple dedicated to the god Hanuman. The principal idol of Hanuman is 32-feet tall and sculpted from a single piece of granite, which the second tallest Hanuman after Panchavatee near Puducherry.

== History ==
The idol of Hanuman was installed in 1989 and consecrated in 1995. Sri Maruthi Bhaktha Samajam Trust, consisting of people with high spiritual beliefs, wished for this temple. Sri Chandrashekarendra Saraswati mahaswamiji of Kanchi Mutt entrenched the 32-foot idol of Anjaneyar in 1989 and consummated the Kumbabishekam in 1995. The distinguished factor of the 32-feet idol is that it was molded out of a single rock.

== The temple ==
The main shrine houses Anjaneya inside a Temple Tower 90 feet tall. Anjaneya is facing west, and thus the main entrance is on the west. There is an auxiliary entrance on the southern side used during temple festivals. The main temple building has path-ways all around the sanctum sanctorum and also a large covered space (mandapa) for devotees to assemble in front of the deity for offering worship.

On the northwest corner is a full-fledged Sannidhi for Lord Rama, Sita, Lakshmana and Hanuman in attendance. The gods are facing east. Rama's role as the protector and ruler is signified here as Rama is seen carrying his bow, hence the name "Kodanda Rama." Southwest, is a Sannidhi for Lord Krishna with Rukmini and Satyabhama, all facing east. Even though a Sannidhi for Lord Rama is normally built in Anjaneya temples, rarely a Sannidhi for Lord Krishna is built. In this temple, Krishna Sannidhi is built to remind the devotees that among the gods it was only Hanuman who was present in both the Indian epics—in Ramayana as a direct disciple of Rama, and in Mahabaratha on the flag of Arjuna's chariot to save it from destruction by the opponents. In the northeast part of the temple, on a small platform, "Vinayaka" is housed facing east and to his left on another platform 'Naga' has been installed. Saint Raghavendra has taken his abode facing Lord Krishna.

The temple was run by a private trust – Sri maruthi bhaktha samajam trust – since consecration on 1995. However, widespread allegations of financial irregularities in the administration of the temple and the trust resulted in several complaints and petitions to the Government of Tamil Nadu. This prompted a review and enquiry by the government and upon unsatisfactory response and evidence from the trust, the Hindu Religious and Charity Endowment Department (HR&CE) declined exemption and took over the administration of the temple since July 2013. Predictably, this action was severely criticized by Sri Maruthi Bhaktha Samajam Trust, the former management, which was accused of the financial irregularities.

== See also ==
- Religion in Chennai
