= Varaha Lakshmi Narasimha temple, Simhachalam =

Hindu temple dedicated to Vishnu in Simhachalam, India

Sri Varaha Lakshmi Narasimha temple, Simhachalam
- 4th Nava Narasimha Temple
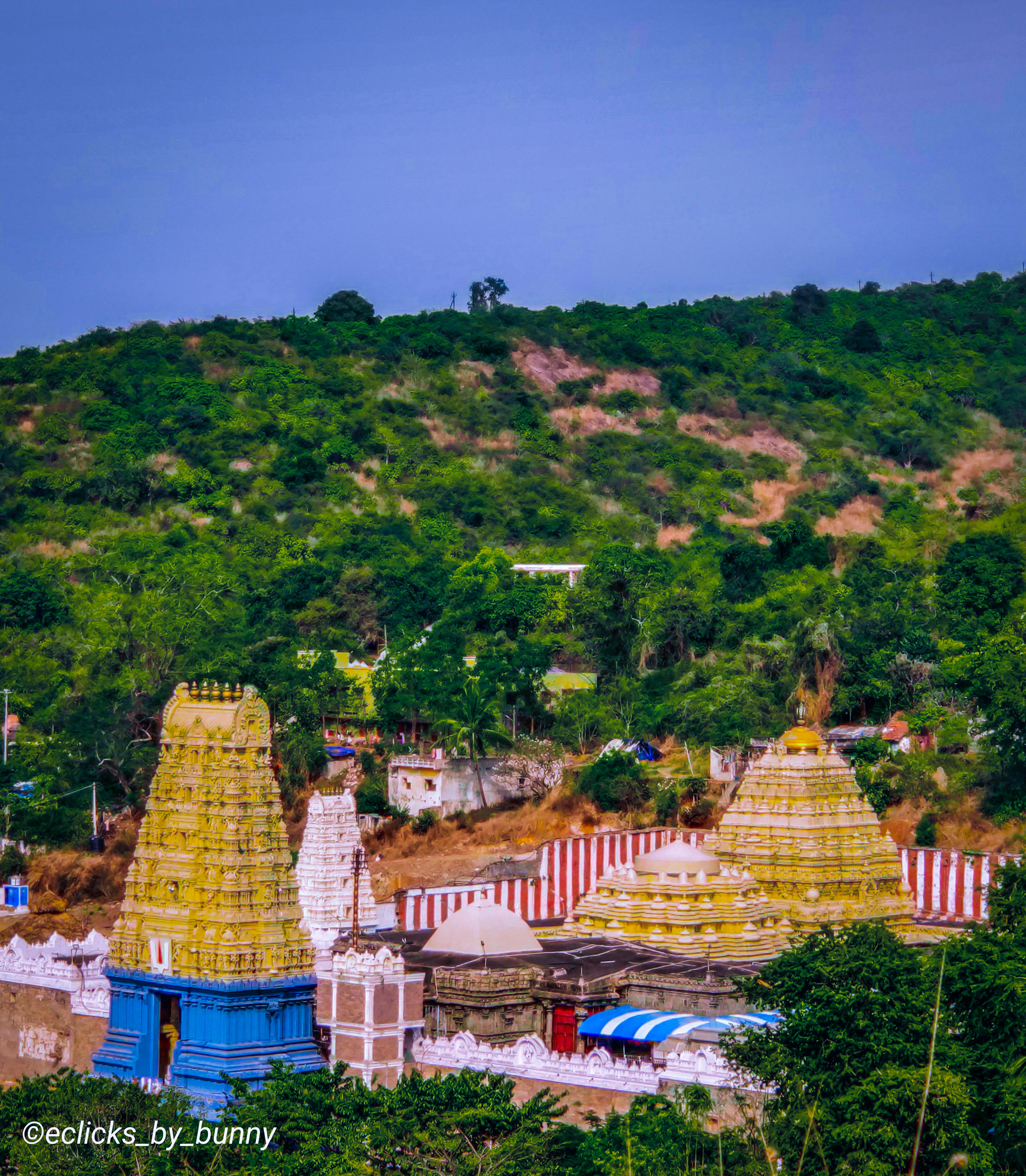
- Front view Simhachalam Temple

- Location of Simhachalam Temple Varaha Lakshmi Narasimha temple, Simhachalam (Andhra Pradesh) Varaha Lakshmi Narasimha temple, Simhachalam (India) Varaha Lakshmi Narasimha temple, Simhachalam (Asia) Varaha Lakshmi Narasimha temple, Simhachalam (Earth)

Religion
- Affiliation: Hinduism
- District: Visakhapatnam
- Deity: Varaha Narasimha (Vishnu), Simhavalli thayar (Lakshmi)
- Festivals: Dola Utsava; Kalyanotsava; Chandanotsava; Narasimha Jayanti; Navaratrotsava; Kamadahana
- Governing body: Ashok Gajapathi Raju (Chairman)

Location
- Location: Simhachalam, Visakhapatnam
- State: Andhra Pradesh
- Country: India
- Coordinates: 17.7664°N 83.2505°E

Architecture
- Style: Kalinga architecture Dravidian Architecture
- Creator: Narasingha Deva I (Present temple)
- Completed: 1268 CE

Website
- http://simhachalamdevasthanam.net/

Sri Varaha Lakshmi Narasimha temple, Simhachalam, is a Hindu temple situated on the Simhachalam Hill Range, which is 300 metres above the sea level in the city of Visakhapatnam, Andhra Pradesh, India. It is dedicated to Lord Vishnu, who is worshipped there as Varaha Narasimha. As per the temple's legend, Vishnu manifested in this form (lion's head and human body) after saving his devotee Prahlada from a murder attempt by the latter's father Hiranyakashipu. Except on Akshaya Tritiya, the idol of Varaha Narasimha is covered with sandalwood paste throughout the year, which makes it resemble a linga. The temple was built in Kalingan architecture styles and stands unique in the historical region of Kalinga. The present temple was built by Eastern Ganga dynasty king Narasingha Deva I in the 13th century and consecrated by his son Bhanudeva I in 1268 AD. The temple was built by Akthayi Senapati, on the command of Narasingha Deva I.

== Legends associated with temple ==
The Sthala Purana (local legend) of Simhachalam consists of 32 chapters; the number denotes the manifestations of Narasimha. According to Dr. V. C. Krishnamacharyulu, the legends of Simhachalam and other Hindu temples in Andhra Pradesh were written in the 14th century after the attempted establishment of Islam in the region. He added that the writers wrote the legends inspired from the stories of Narasimha available in the Hindu puranas. Hence, Vishnu Purana and Bhagavata Purana form the major sources. However, the legend of Simhachalam provides new information about the previous life of the temple's founder Prahlada. The first four chapters of the legend cover the importance of Simhachalam, its deity and the principal water body Gangadhara.

=== Origins of the temple ===
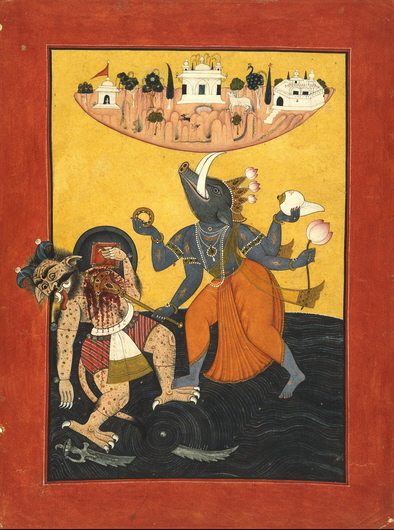
A 1740 Chamba painting showing the slaying of the demon Hiranyaksha by lord Vishnu as Varaha with four hands. Varaha is also shown balancing the earth on his tusks.

Once, the Four Kumaras, who were the mind-born sons of Lord Brahma, visited lord Vishnu's abode Vaikuntha as children. Jaya-Vijaya, the demigod gatekeepers of Vaikuntha, failed to recognise them and denied their entry. In resentment, they cursed the duo stating that they would have to give up divinity, born and live the lives of mortal beings on earth. Vishnu failed to revoke the curse of the Kumaras and felt sorry. He later offered two solutions: either being Vishnu's devotees in seven human lives or his enemies in three demonic lives. Jaya-Vijaya could not bear separation with Vishnu for a long time and chose the second possibility.

In their first demonic lives during the Satya Yuga, Jaya-Vijaya were born as Hiranyakashipu and Hiranyaksha to sage Kashyapa and Diti(a daughter of Daksha) in an inauspicious time during a sunset. It is said that asuras were born to them as a result of their union at the time of dusk, which was said to be an inauspicious time for such a deed.

To tease lord Brahma and other gods, Hiranyaksha ensured that earth loses its vitality and sinks into the rasatala, the lowest level in the cosmic universe. Vishnu assumed the form of a boar referred to as Varaha and restored earth to its normal position. Varaha later killed Hiranyaksha in a war that lasted for thousand years. Hiranyakashipu vowed to seek revenge and prayed to Brahma. He gained a boon which made him invulnerable to death either by day or night, either in the morning or the night, and either by a human or a beast.

When the gods headed by Brahma visited Vaikuntham to tell an account of the happenings to Vishnu, a guardian named Sumukha obstructed them. They manage to meet Vishnu and also convey the misbehaviour of Sumukha. Vishnu assured that Hiranyakashipu shall be killed and Sumukha would be the serving cause. Sumukha pleaded for a pardon but Vishnu denied, saying that an offence against his devotees is inexcusable. As per Vishnu's orders, Sumukha was born as Hiranyakashipu's son Prahlada.

Prahlada displayed staunch devotion towards Vishnu in his childhood. As a result, he had to face many death trails. In one such instance, Hiranyakashipu's soldiers threw him from the top of a hill and placed the mountain on him. Vishnu jumped over the hill and lifted Prahlada from the sea. Prahlada asked Vishnu to assume a deity form where the avatars of Varaha, who killed Hiranyaksha and Narasimha, the one who would kill Hiranyakashipu soon, can be seen together. Vishnu assumed the form of Varaha Narasimha, for whom Prahlada built a temple after Hiranyakashipu's death. Worship was conducted and the place was named Simhachalam (lion's hill). This is covered from 5th to 29th chapters of the legend.

=== Reconstruction by Pururava ===
At the end of the life cycle, the temple Prahlada built was neglected and subsequently decayed. The moolavar of Varaha Narasimha was covered with crests of earth. In another life cycle, king Pururava of lunar dynasty acquired Pushpaka Vimana (divine air car) from Brahma as a boon. He saw Urvasi, an apsara at the Kailasa mountain and both fell in love. They visited Simhachalam and settled here for a while. Urvasi recollected a dream and located the idol. Pururava performed penance at Gangadhara for the same. They unearthed the idol and consecrated it after renovation.

Despite his best efforts, Pururava could not find the idol's feet. A divine voice consoled him, saying that he need not worry about that, adding that the deity can provide salvation in its current form. Urvasi was instructed in the dream that the idol of Varaha Narasimha should be covered with sandalwood paste for the whole year except on the third day of the Vaisakha month. This custom is practiced strictly even today. The reconstruction of the temple by Pururava is covered in the last four chapters of the legend.

=== Ramanuja's visit ===
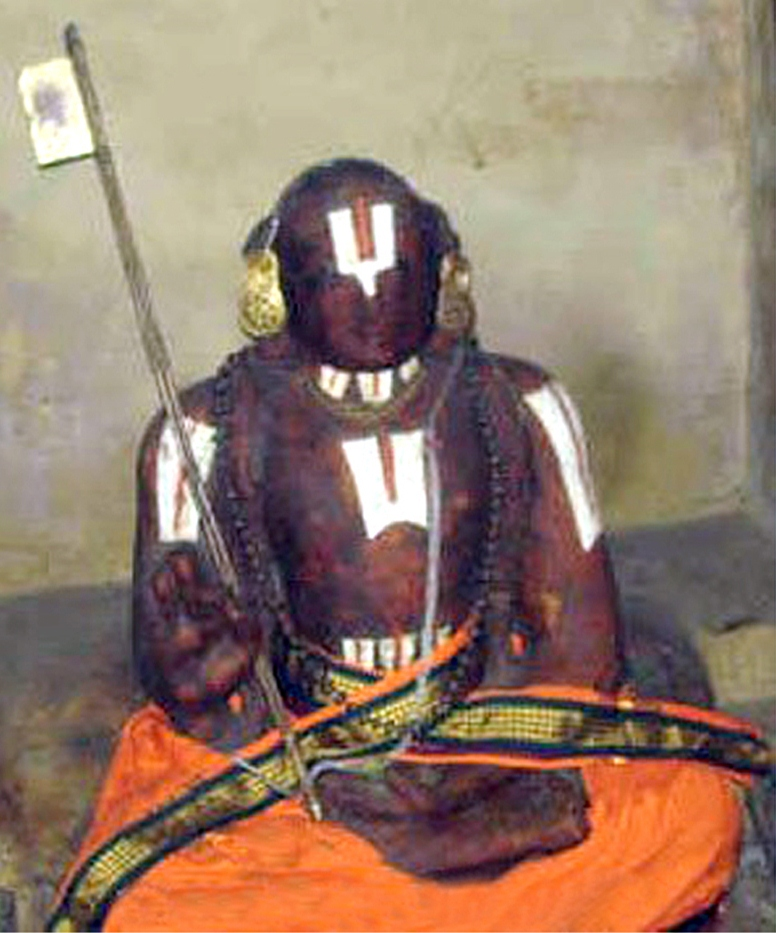
An idol of Ramanuja in the Srirangam Ranganathaswamy temple.

In the 11th century CE, after winning a debate at the Puri Jagannath temple, Vaishnavite saint and philosopher Ramanuja visited Srikurmam and Simhachalam temples. Simhachalam's deity was believed to be Shiva due to some reasons. The notable ones were the unusual position of the deity's idol, the gate at the lower terrain named Bhairava Dwaram, and the second temple tank being referred to with the name Gangadhara. The annual celebration of Kamadahana, a tradition usually observed in Shiva's temples, was practiced here which added strength to the beliefs.

Ramanuja argued that the idol of Varaha Narasimha is in a posture in accordance with the Pancharatra Agama rules. He added that Kamadahana is celebrated here for the temple's purification as per the Sishtachara traditions. Ramanuja pointed out that Shiva's manifestation Bhairava is neither the guardian of the Bhairava Dwaram nor worshipped as one. Ramanuja was able to defeat the scholars at Simhachalam and converted it into a Vaishnavite temple.

Varaha Narasimha's idol, when covered with sandalwood paste, resembles a Shiva Lingam. Ramanuja took personal possession of the temple and ordered the priests to remove the paste. The conversion work began and before completion, the idol started bleeding. Feeling the deity's anger for violating the rule, sandalwood paste was applied again which stopped the blood stream. They presumed that the deity wished to look like a Lingam and continued the tradition except for one day. Few Vaishnavites oppose this legend, calling it a deliberate attempt to "debase the prestige of Vaishnava shrines in general" and of Ramanuja in particular.

=== Krishnamacharyulu's curse ===
Sri Kantha Krishnamacharyulu was a poet and musician who composed sankeertanas in praise of Varaha Narasimha. As Narasimha danced listening to those songs, Krishnamacharyulu began showing offensive attitude towards others with arrogance. When Ramanuja visited Simhachalam later, Krishnamacharyulu did not treat him properly. Ramanuja wanted to know whether Vishnu would grant him salvation and requested Krishnamacharyulu to ask Narasimha about the same. He obeyed and asked Narasimha, to which the deity replied that Ramanuja is capable of giving salvation to others and hence can gain the same later.

Krishnamacharyulu requested Narasimha to grant him salvation. To teach him a lesson, Narasimha refused, saying that Ramanuja is the only one capable one to do so. Krishnamacharyulu was offended and cursed that the temple would be attacked in the upcoming days. It is believed that the attack on the temple in the 18th century by Muslim invaders was a result of the curse. Though this legend is considered imaginary, it is respected widely for emphasising the importance of teachers and spiritual masters over the divine.

== History ==
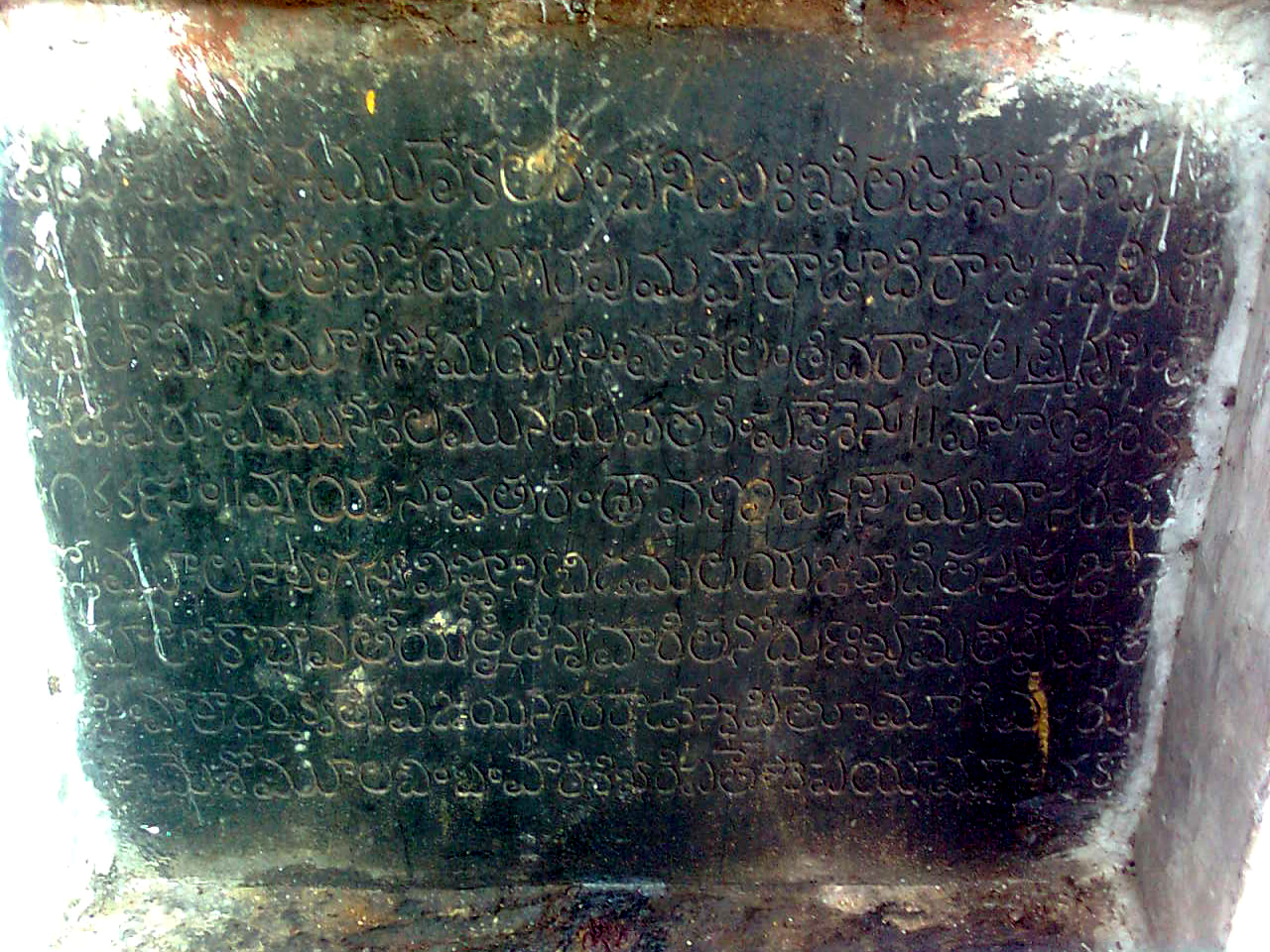
An inscription on the way to the temple complex written in Telugu language.

Simhachalam temple has a past of nearly a thousand years. Epigraphists discovered nearly 500 inscriptions in the temple complex. Almost all of them were dana sasanas (donation records) which referred to the contributions made by the kings, their officers, and the citizens. Majority of the inscriptions are bilingual, written in Sanskrit and Telugu languages. While some are exclusively in Sanskrit, there are 46 Odia and three Tamil language inscriptions. As per the common acceptance of historians, Simhachalam temple has been recognised in the 11th century CE due to an inscription by the Chola king Kulottunga I. The earliest inscription discovered in the temple, it belonged to the 11th century and was dated to 1087 CE. It recorded the gift of a garden by a private individual. The temple functioned well during this period and received liberal patronage from the Later Cholas.

After the Later Cholas, the Eastern Ganga dynasty extended their patronage for the promotion and preservation of the temple complex. Their inscriptions ranges from 1150 CE to 1430 CE. In the later half of the 13th century, the temple complex underwent radical physical changes during the reign of Narasimhadeva I. Many additional architectural adjuncts were added to the temple which had a simple and modest look. An inscription dated 1293 CE refers to the addition of sub shrines by the Gangas in the temple, which were dedicated to manifestations of Vishnu: Vaikunthanatha, Yagnavaraha, and Madhavadevara. The renovators used the original slabs as much as possible and discarded a few of them. The removed ones were later used in the kitchen and other small shrines. The feudatory chiefs of the Ganga dynasty too contributed towards the temple's architecture and made donations in various forms.

Four inscriptions of the temple recorded the donation of land, jewels, and villages by the kings of the Reddy dynasty, who did some substantial service to the temple. After the fall of the Eastern Gangas, the Gajapathis came into power. Nine inscriptions written in Odia language recorded the contributions by Gajapatis Kapilendradeva, Purushottama Deva and Prataprudra Deva. The temple received support from the Tuluva dynasty of the Vijayanagara Empire. Their inscriptions range from 1516 to 1519 CE. During his military campaigns at the Kalinga region, Krishnadevaraya erected a Jayastambha (pillar of victory) at Simhachalam. He gifted ornaments to the deity for the merit of his parents. His wives Tirumala Devi and Chinnamma Devi also gifted ornaments. The Tuluva kings supported the perpetuation of the property of Simhachalam up to 16th century CE.

After the fall of the Vijayanagara Empire, the Muslim states of Deccan asserted independence. The Qutb Shahi dynasty began its rule with Golkonda as their capital. A solitary inscription dated 1604 CE records gifting the lands and resources of Narava village as a sarvamanya by Sarvappa Asraraya with a view to restore the regular religious practices and offerings. Apart from mentioning the military achievements of Asraraya, the inscription confirmed 40 years of religious inactivity from 1564 to 1604 CE. In these 40 years, two inscriptions were found dated 1579 and 1597 CE; they registered the gifts donated to the temple. Apart from the above, 300 inscriptions in between the 11th and 18th centuries make a note of the contributions made by private individuals. The latest inscription of the temple is dated 1798 CE, which recorded a gift made by Chengalvaraya of the Gode family.

In 1949, the temple came under the purview of the endowment ministry of the State Government. The members of the Pusapati Gajapathi family of the princely state of Vizianagaram are the current hereditary trustees of the temple. The members of the family are serving the temple for the last three centuries.

== The temple ==
=== Geography ===
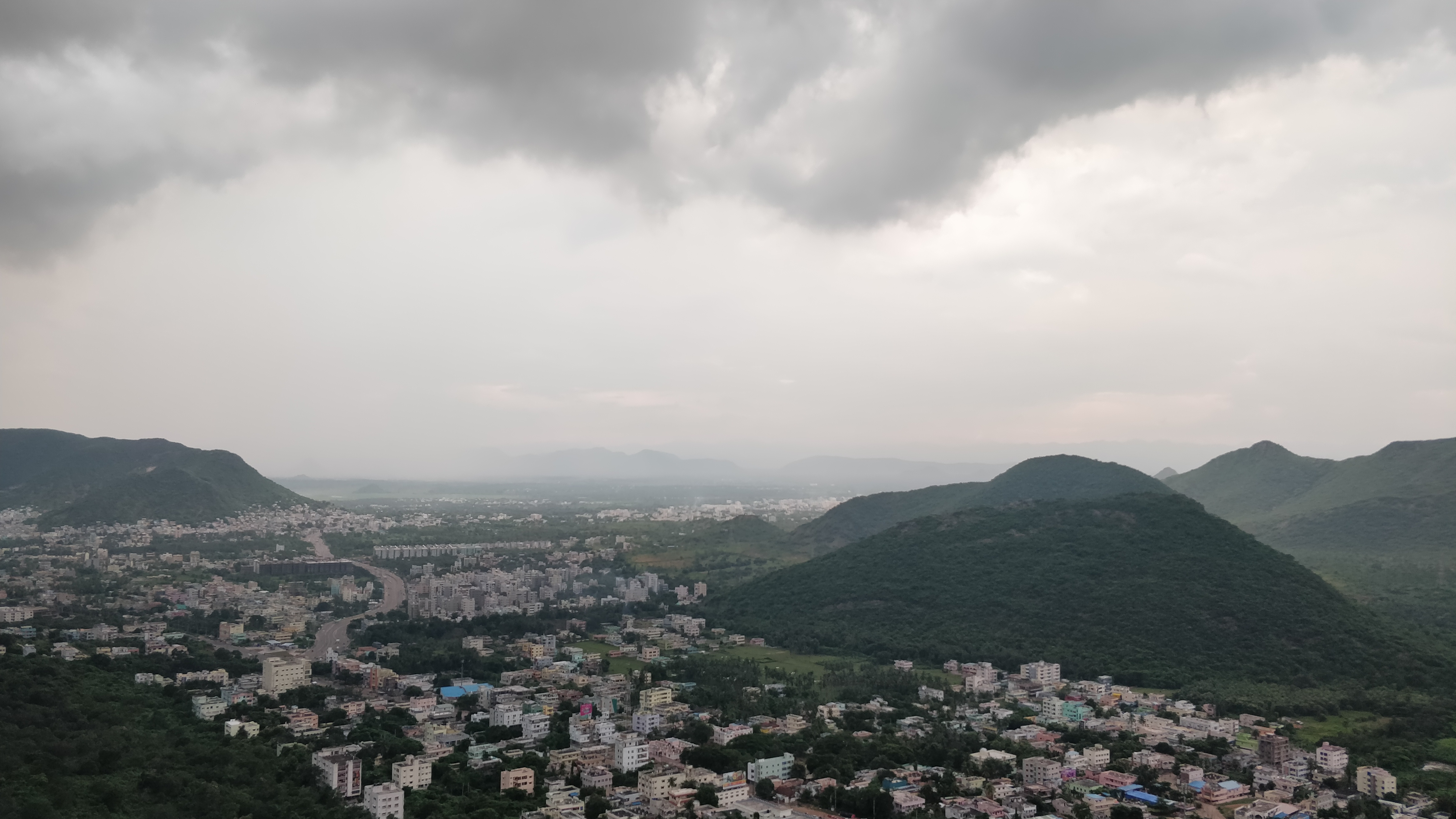
Simhachalam locality from hill top

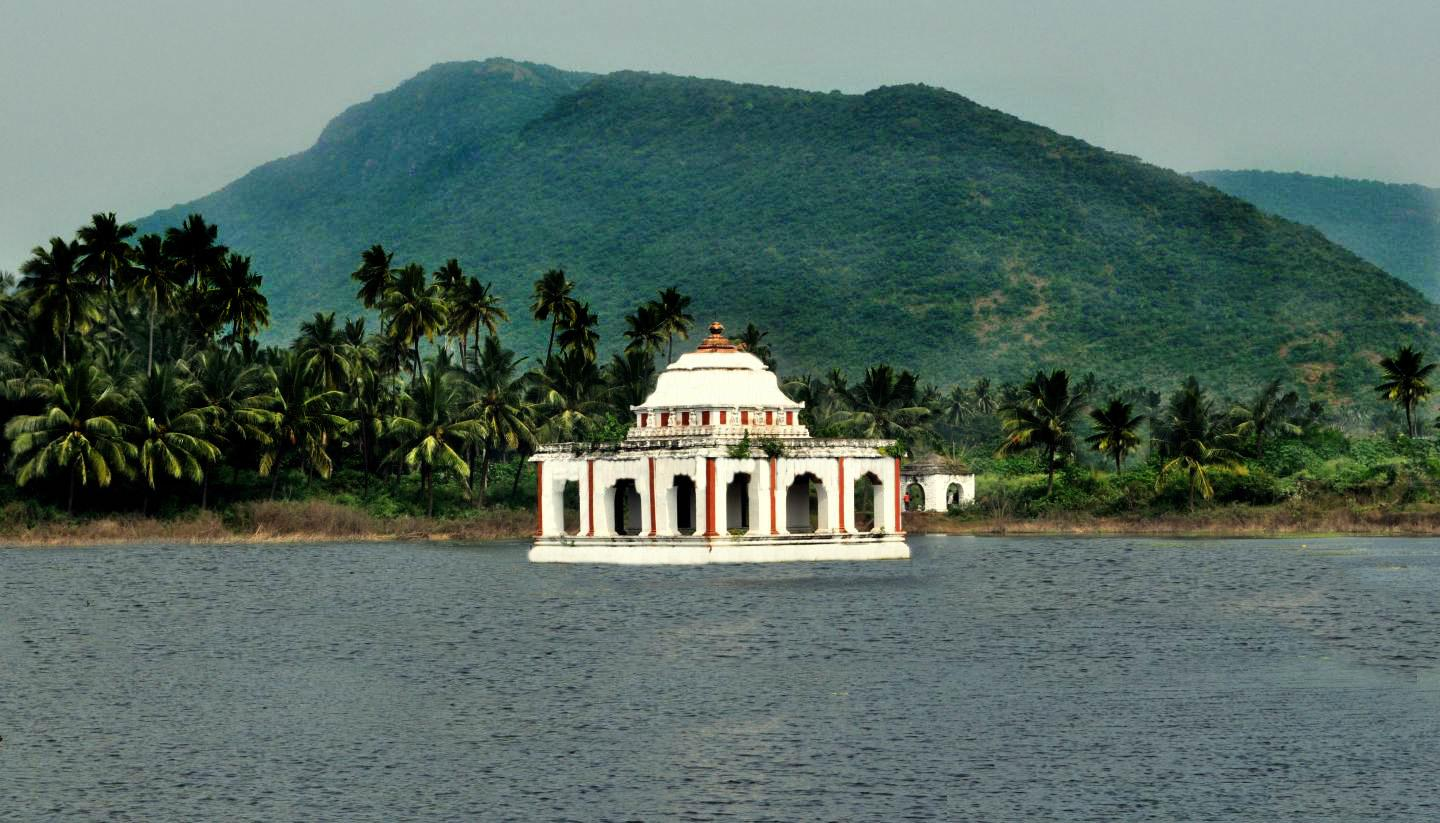
A view of Gangadhara, the temple's tank below the hill. It is also referred to as the Varaha Pushkarini.

The temple is situated on Simhachalam Hill Range 800 metres (2,600 ft) above the sea level at a distance of ten miles to the north of Visakhapatnam. The hill range is a part of the Eastern Ghats and is named Kailasa. It is situated on the top of the northern side of the hill in an amphitheatre like structure. The height of the temple is nearly 1,500 metres (4,900 ft) above the sea level. A natural valley is seen running along the north western slope of the hill, which covers almost half of its height. The hill range, cut into terraces, was used later to cultivate large plantations of pineapple, jack fruit, and Banana. A small village grew around the temple in due course of time. Steps were built alongside the stream of water to serve as a way of approach to both the village and the temple.

Due to the soil nature, rainfall and the climatic conditions influenced by the sea level, the growth of flora is abundant on the hill range. The hills also contain medical herbs used to cure the diseases of both humans and cattle. There are various ways to reach the temple. The most popular one is the flight of one thousand steps from the foot of hill whose entrance is referred to as the Bhairava Dwaram. On one side, a pathway runs from Madhava Dwaram to the top. On the other side, at the foot of the hill, roads were laid starting from the Bhairava Dwaram to the top. Simhachalam has two temple tanks: the Swami Pushkarini at the top and Gangadhara at the bottom, which is referred to as the Varaha Pushkarini. They are similar to the ones found in the Tirumala Venkateswara Temple. In addition, there are three natural springs named Akashadhara, Chakradhara, and Madhavadhara. At the foot of the hill, two gardens are available where festivals are celebrated.

=== Architecture ===
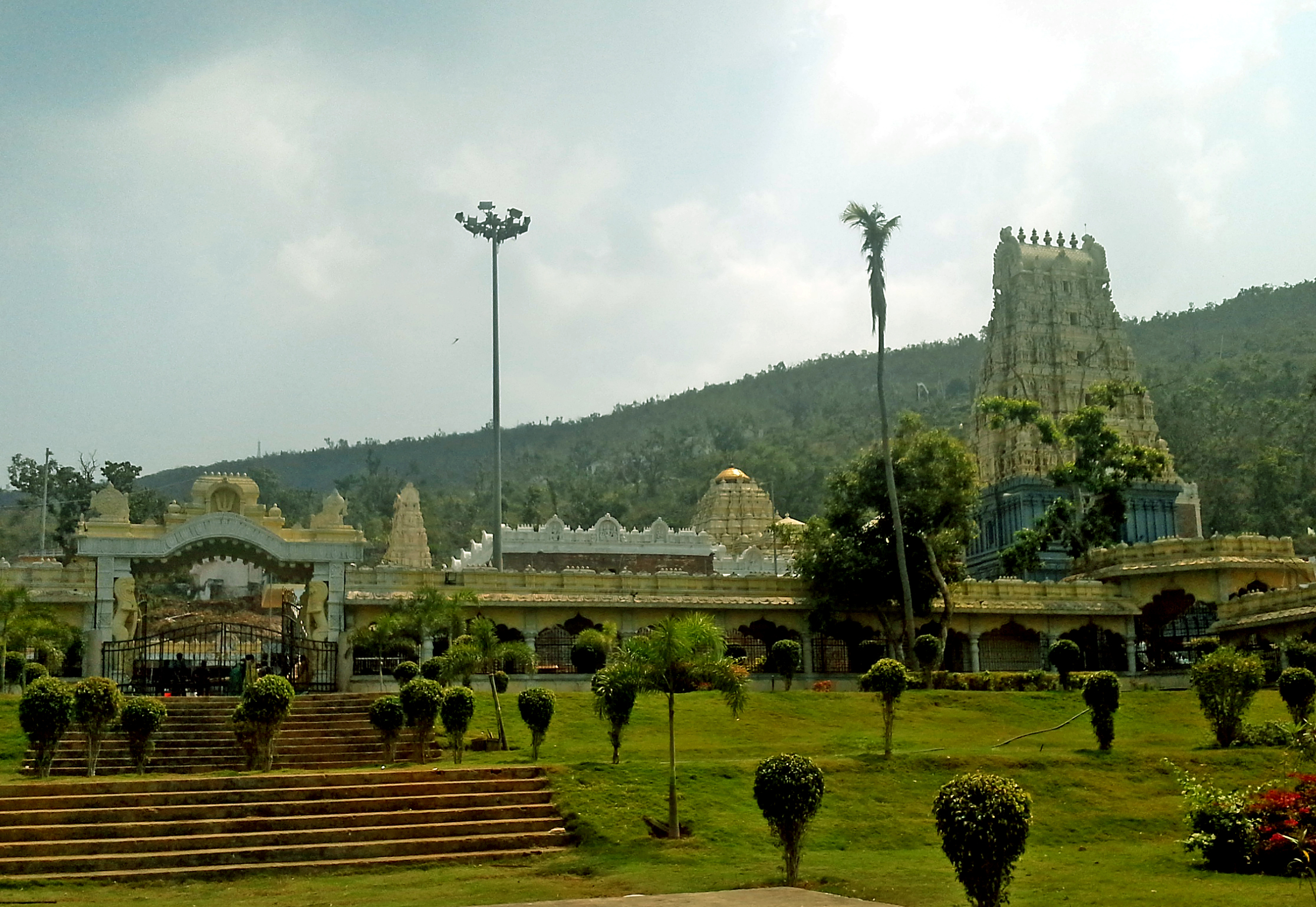
A view of the temple's complex in which the rajagopuram and the vimana can be seen adjacent to each other.

Simhachalam temple resembles a fortress from outside with three prakarams (outer courtyards) and five gateways. Majority of the temple's present form is the one rebuilt by Narasimhadeva I. Its architecture is a mixture of the styles of the Eastern Gangas, Eastern Chalukyas, and the Cholas. It faces west, an unusual case in the usual tradition of temple architecture. It is believed that the temple initially faced east, but was changed to west due to inexplicable reasons. As per the Hindu texts Purushottama Samhita and the Vishnu Samhita, a temple facing west signifies victory unlike the east ones which denotes prosperity. It is believed that the Gangadhara's flow from the east to the west might be a reason why the temple faces west. A prakaram covers the entire temple with two gateways on the northern and western sides. The temple has a five-tier rajagopuram (main tower) on the western gateway. Devotees enter the temple through a side door with a stairway, which leads into the Kalyana mandapa (wedding hall), which has 96 pillars. It has coloumns and walls on which the images of Vishnu, his consort Lakshmi and the Alvars are carved. Near the entrance, the foot prints of Hindu saint Chaitanya Mahaprabhu installed by Bhaktisiddhanta Sarasvati in the year 1930 can be seen. At the end, a gateway leads to the main hall. Before the sanctum sanctorum, an altar with the images of Radha and Krishna can be seen.

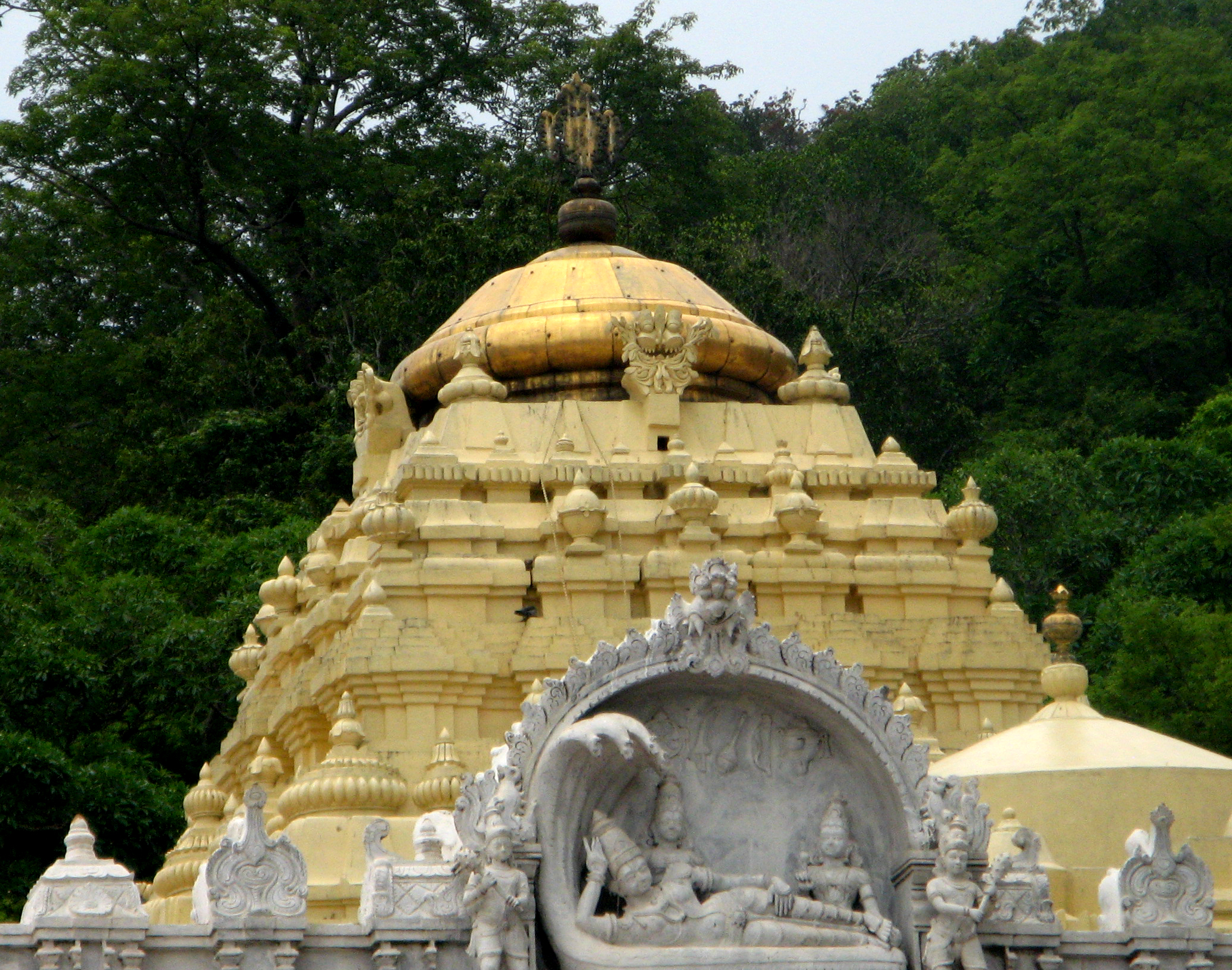
The vimana of Simhachalam temple with a gold plated dome featuring a Vaishnavite icon.

The sanctum sanctorum of the temple is cubical-shaped whose walls feature sculptures carved in Kalinga style. The three-tier vimana, called pidha deula in Odia silpasastra, is similar to that of the Konark temple, is shaped like a stepped pyramid with proper carving of sculptures. The corners of the base of the vimana bear lion statuettes symbolising Narasimha. On the eastern face of the vimana, images of Indra and Gajalakshmi are found. A gold plated dome with a Vaishnavite symbol caps the vimana. On the southern wall of the sanctorum, a sculpture of Narasimha killing Hiranyakashipu in Prahlada's presence is present. Narasimha is seen in a standing posture, a unique feature of the temple's architecture. The fore arms lay on Hiranyakashipu whose is kept on the left thigh, and the rear arms hold a weapon and a conch. On the northern wall, a sculpture of Varaha is seen, which is similar to the ones found in the Belur Chennakeshava and Hoysaleswara temples. Krishna's images are found above these two sculptures. The southern wall depicts a scene of Kalinga Marthana and the northern wall has an image of Krishna lifting the Govardhan Hill.

In the north western corner of the temple, there are two halls named Vaisakha and Jyestha mandapas where special occasions are conducted. To the right of the northern entrance, there is a 16-pillared Natya mandapa (dance hall) where the pillars feature simhalalathas (lion heads) at their base. The temple has two jagattis (railed parapets). The outer jagatti around the artha mandapa carries a row of sculpted elephants denoting strength. The inner one, around the sanctum sanctorum contains a row of swans. Above this, a scrollwork with sculpted figures and a row of simhalalatas are found. On the supporting pillars, simhalalatas are seen on elephant sculptures, with convolution carrying figures in between. The eaves of the sidewalls feature stone-made filigree work. A study of the sculptures and pillars in the Kalyana mandapa revealed that basalt and schist were used in the construction. The thirty two manifestations of Narasimha, including the temple's deity, are carved on the pillars of the Kalyana mandapa. In the Mukha mandapa (main hall), there is a pillar named Kappam Stambham which is believed to have curative powers. It is consecrated using the Santana Venugopalaswamy Yantra and is known to grant unfulfilled wishes.

=== Shrines ===
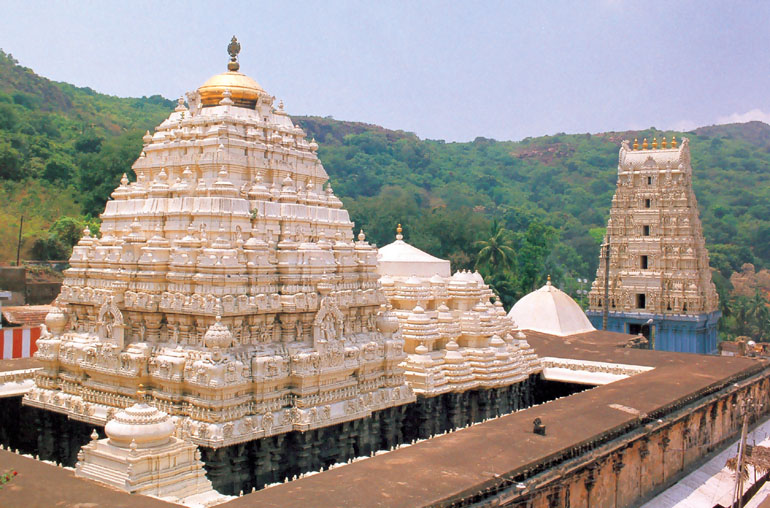
The sanctum sanctorum (pidha deula) of Simhachalam in which the temple's deity is housed. The rajagopuram can be seen towards the right.

The moolavirat of Varaha Narasimha is kept in a separate hall named Prahlada mandapa. In its original form, the idol of Varaha Narasimha is two and a half feet tall. The deity stands in a tribhanga posture with a boar's head, a human torso and a lion's tail. On either side of the deity, the idols of Sridevi and Bhudevi holding lotus flowers are seen. The sculpture of Varaha Narasimha has no ornaments and drapery carved on the body. Its limbs and face are disfigured due to vandalism. The moolavar is covered with sandalwood paste imported from Srivilliputhur, Tamil Nadu. After application of the sandalwood paste, the moolavar resembles a four feet tall Shiva Lingam. There is enough space for the devotees to offer pradakshinas (circumambulations) to the deity inside the Prahlada mandapa. There are only four main ornaments used in the temple: a Thirunamam made of diamonds and rubies, a chain of emeralds, a 100-tola gold bracelet, and a golden crown.

A number of sub shrines are housed inside the temple complex. Two of them are dedicated to Andal, one of the 12 Alvars and Lakshmi, the consort of the principal deity. The latter is housed in a small room located near the north western wall; it served as a cell of the temple's treasury in the past. Lakshmi is referred to as Simhavalli Thayar, and her idol is in a lotus position with four hands. The fore arms display abhayamudra and varadamudra, and the rear arms hold a pair of lotus flowers. The remaining eleven Alvars are accommodated in separate rooms. Sub-temples are dedicated to Ramanuja, Manavala Mamunigal and Vishvaksena inside the main complex.

=== Administration and staff ===
The staff of the temple is divided into three groups: the ones involved in religious duties, those who help in preparations for worship, and the administration and supervision related personnel. The Parikshagar and the Sthanapati (or Sthanacharya) were the biggest dignitaries of the temple. These two posts were held by the family members of the Tirumala Peddinti family. At a later point, due to reluctance of the family members, the office of the Sthanapati was merged with that of the Parikshagar. The main duty of a Parikshagar was to ensure that all the daily and special rituals were being conducted in accordance with the injunctions of the past. On the other hand, the Sthanapati used to initiate every proceeding on the temple and served as the representative of the trustees. At present, the temple is maintained and administered by the Simhachalam Devasthanam board, which is under the purview of the Government of Andhra Pradesh.

The priests of the temple are divided into three main groups: Archakas, Nambyas, and Paricharakas. The priests belong to the Sri Vaishnavite clan. These priests were classified into three groups: the local Vaishnavites, Tirupathi Vaishnavites (hailing from Tirumala), and Ekaki Vaishnavites (those who are unmarried and practice celibacy). Archakas look after the actual conduct of rituals in the main temple, of whom one is the head priest. Equivalent to Sthanacharya, the head priest has the additional responsibility of decorating the deity with ornaments on important occasions. The priests of the sub-temples and shrines are called Nambyas or Samardhaka Brahmins. Paricharakas assist the archakas by performing tasks such as cleaning vessels required for rituals, bringing water to the kitchen, and collecting items required for the prayer.

Scholars are appointed by the temple to read various religious texts. One of them referred to as the Bhagavata Vishyam Pandit, along with six adhyapakas (teachers) recite the Dravida Prabandha text daily. These people belong to the Vaishnavite families of Simhachalam. Scholars who read out chapters from the Mahabharata, the Ramayana and the Bhagavata Purana are known as Parayandars (Parayana reading pandits). Apart from these, vedic scholars are also appointed for regular recital of the Rigveda, Samaveda, and Yajurveda. In the medieval period, a group of sanis or devadasis used to perform four important tasks: performing dance and music, singing mangalagitas and namasankirtanas, waving fly-whisks to the deity, and cleaning and decorating the temple's premises. They were looked upon with respect as the temple's dancers. Women were either gifted as sanis or voluntarily dedicated themselves for the same. They either remained unmarried (referred to as the sampradaya sanis) or had an independent marital life, working in the temple on a part-time basis. At present, the temple does not encourage the presence of such dancers.

Cooks hailing from Vaishnavite families and well-versed in the Agni mantra were employed to prepare the bhoga (offerings) to the deity. Other important personnel include water carriers, gardeners, potters, fuel suppliers, goldsmiths, flag bearers, torch bearers, watchmen, repairers and renovators, and cattle maintainers.

== Religious practices ==
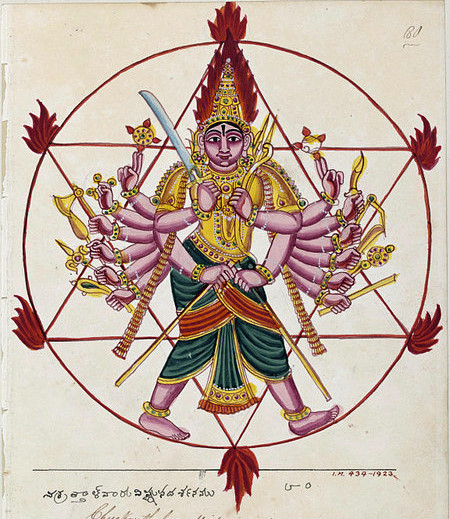
A painting of Sudarshana Chakra with 16 hands. He serves as the bali bera (guardian idol) of Varaha Narasimha and forms part of the Baliharana (pacification) ceremony.

The religious practices and customs of the temple are formulated by Ramanuja and his followers like Anandalvan. They are similar to the ones followed in South Indian Vaishnavite temples such as Tirumala, Srirangam, and the Varadharaja Perumal Temple in Kanchipuram. The prayers are made as per the Para, Vyuha, Vibhava, Antaryami, and Archa traditions of Vishnu. The religious practices are modelled based on the Satvata Samhita, one of the 108 texts of the Pancharatra Agama. There are five metallic idols associated with the deity which serve as the substitute of the moolavar for certain practices. Yogananda Narasimha is the snapana bera (bathing idol), Govindaraja is the utsava bera (festival idol), and Sudarshana Chakra is the bali bera (guardian idol). Madanagopala and Venugopala, two forms of Krishna, are the kautuka bera (representative idol) and the sayana bera (sleeping idol) respectively.

The deity worship commences in the morning around 5:30 am. The inner gates of the temple are opened and the Vayu mantra is recited. The priests chant the Suprabhatam for about an hour and half as a prelude to the regular worship activities. It is accompanied by people playing nadaswaram (pipe instrument). The laghvarchana (preliminary worship) is performed; priests offer jaggery and coconut after which the mangala harathi (incense) is provided to the deity. Devotees are allowed to visit the sanctum sanctorum from 6:30 am for the next five hours. The actual worship continues up to 8:00 am which consists of shodasha upachara (sixteen services). Abhisheka (anointment) is performed to the Yogananda Narasimha idol. The last phase of the morning worship is the Baliharana (pacification ceremony), where a portion of the consecrated food is offered to the spirits. Sudarshana Chakra idol is used in this phase. The morning rituals in the sub-temples follow a similar pattern, with the preliminary worship and offerings provided in each temple in succession.

After 11:00 am, the temple's mid day worship begins. After half an hour, rajabhoga (main offering) is offered to the deity. The pilgrims are not allowed to visit the sanctum for the next half an hour. Rajabhoga consists of cooked rice, dal, soup, cooked vegetables, ghee and curd. Another half an hour break is given to the deity at 2:30 pm. Devotees are then allowed to visit the sanctum up to 7:00 pm. In the evening worship, which begins at 6:00 pm, begins with the Divviti Salam (salute with torches) ceremony. Two men go round the temple; one holds a torch and the other plays a drum. The rituals offered in the evening are similar to that of the morning worship. The importance given to music is the major deviation. Night offering is provided to the deity. Devotees are allowed to have a glimpse of the deity for half an hour from 8:30 pm. At 9:00 pm, sayana seva (sleeping ritual) is performed and the temple is closed.

Devotees can take part in two special rituals that are conducted in the temple. One is the Nithya kalyanam (regular marriage) of the deity which is conducted every day. The other one is the Swarnapushpa archana (worship with golden flowers). It is conducted along with the morning worship rituals on every Thursday. Other notable rituals of similar nature are the Sahasranama archana (recital of thousand names), Garuda seva, and cow worship to name a few.

== Festivals ==
Majority of the donations made to the Simhachalam temple are related to the conduction of festivals. The festivals are referred to with the name utsavas. Except for Kumara Punnami, almost all the utsavas are celebrated even today. The utsavas are divided into two categories: those governed by the Agama texts and the ones regulated by the customs and traditions (sishtachara). The performances and festivals are also classified into daily, weekly, fortnightly, monthly, and annual ones. These are meant for the material and spiritual progress of humans apart from their yogakshema (well-being).

The festivals celebrated in Simhachalam have an influence of the Dravida Sampradaya, the customs followed in Tamil Nadu. The influence is observed in the way the deities are referred to as, and the usage of the word 'Thiru' for few things connected with the temple and its practices. Also, the celebrations take place at a time governed by the Suryamaana (sun-centric) system followed in Tamil Nadu, unlike that of Andhra Pradesh which follows Chaandramaana (lunar-centric) system. Kalyanotsava (celestial marriage) and Chandanotsava (sandalwood festival) are the two most important annual utsavas celebrated in the temple among others.

=== Important festivals ===
==== Kalyanotsava ====
Bhaktotsava event of Kalyanotsava, the annual celestial marriage of Varaha Narasimha, is celebrated on the 11th day of the first quarter of the Indian lunar Chaitra month. This utsava is celebrated for five days. This utsava is not mentioned in any inscriptions of the temple. However, an inscription dated 1401 CE records the gift of a flag staff named the Garudaroha Kamba for celebrating the Divya mahotsavas (sacred key festivals). The gift was made on the fifth day of the bright fortnight of the Chaitra month. For the same reason, Kalyanotsava is considered as the mahotsava of Simhachalam. Also, the principal items used for mahotsavas in other South Indian Hindu temples are utilised for this marriage event. The Kalyanotsava begins with hoisting of the Garudadhwaja (flag of Garuda).

Kalyanotsava resembles the weddings seen in Hindu families. The procedure of this utsava consists of the following events in succession: Ankurarpanam (the formal start), Rathotsava (chariot ride festival), Avabhruta snana (purification ceremony), Bhaktotsava (rewarding a devotee), and sayana seva (sleeping ritual). Ankurarpanam happens on the 14th day; Brahma and the eight guardians of the directions are invoked by chanting hymns and sowing nine kinds of seeds in specially-made earthen pots. The priests make the mahasankalpa (great resolve). To mark this, they tie threads made of Kusha grass to their wrists and to those of the deities'. Preliminaries of the Kalyanotsava begin on the nightfall of the 15th day. Baliharana is performed not only in the temple but also extends over the entire village on the hill to appease the deities. Before entering the marriage hall, the deities are taken round the village on a ratha (temple car) pulled by devotees. This event is known as Rathotsava. The deities enter the marriage hall at around 10:00 pm and the marriage of Varaha Narasimha and his consorts is performed.

From the 12th day, the daily worship is performed in the usual day. Religious discourses on sacred Hindu texts take place in the morning. In the night, musical, recital and other similar entertainment activities are performed by scholars. The next day, priests invoke the guardians of directions and selected hymns are chanted. Purnahuti (last sacrificial rite) is offered to Agni, the fire god on the last day. After conducting the purification ceremony at Gangadhara, Bhaktotsava is celebrated. Bhaktotsava is celebrated by reciting the legends of Thirumangai (one of the 12 Alvars) in Telugu language. The Garudadhwaja is unhoisted to signify the end of Kalyanotsava. On the sixth day, the Telugu work Lakshmi Narayana Samvadam, which is about a game of wit between Vishnu and Lakshmi, is read aloud. After its completion, the deities are put to bed by performing sayana seva.

==== Chandanotsava ====
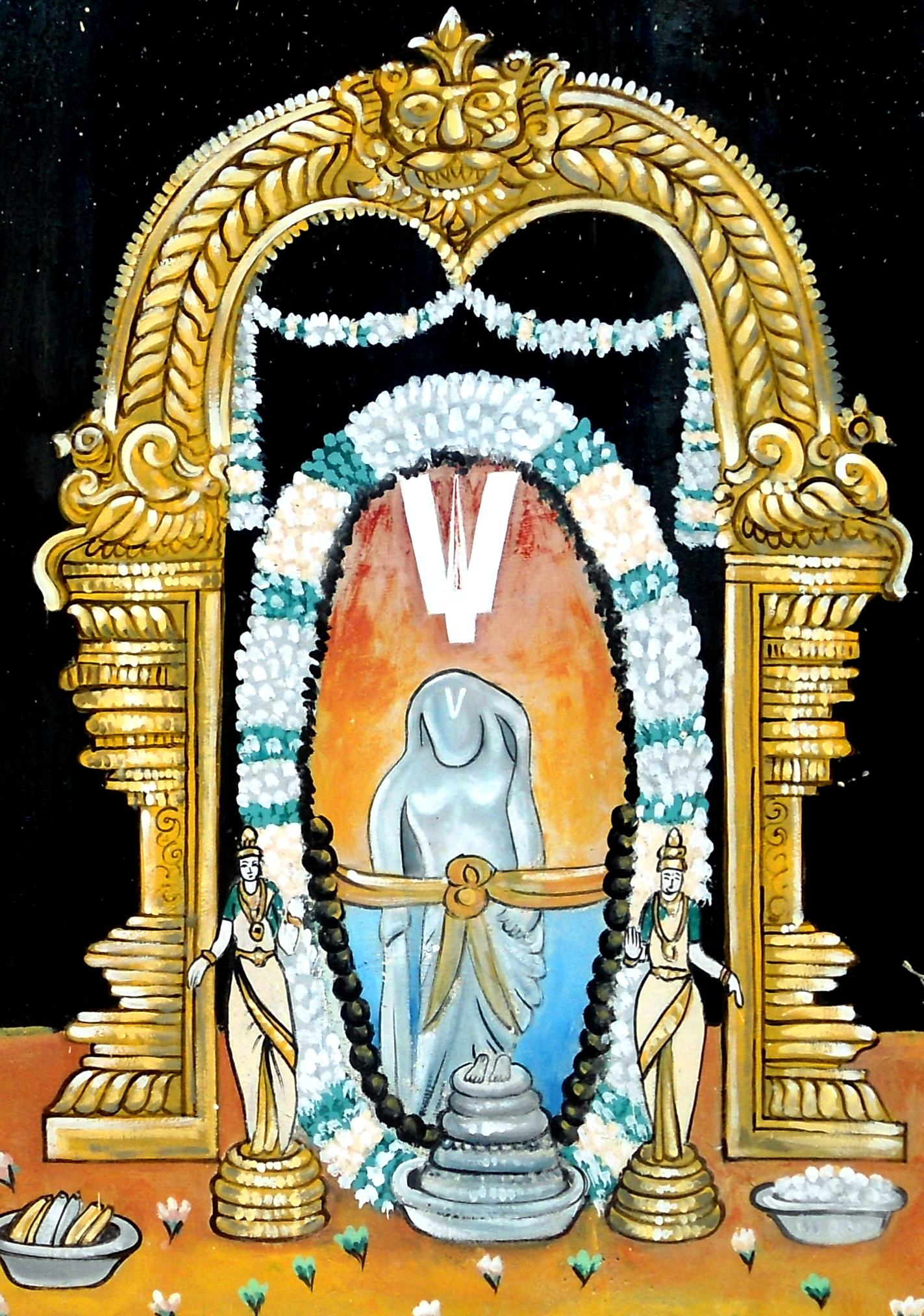
A painting at the Bhadrachalam temple depicting both the original form of the moolavar and the Lingam-like one after applying sandalwood paste.

Chandanotsava (sandalwood festival), also known as Chandan Yatra, is the most important festival celebrated in the temple. It is celebrated on the festival day of Akshaya Tritiya (April – May) in accordance to the temple's legend. On this day, the Sandalwood paste, commonly referred to as Chandanam, covering the moolavar throughout the year is removed. As a result, devotees can see the original form of the deity's idol for 12 hours once in the whole year.

Chandanam is applied to the moolavar on four days in a year: on Akshaya Tritiya and full moon days of the Vaisakha, Jyeshta, and Ashadha months. Every time, four manugus of Chandanam is applied. (Note: Manugu is a unit of measurement in Telugu language, which is approximately equal to 24 pounds.) The sandalwood paste that covers the deity is removed early in the morning at 4:00 am. The prayers and abhisheka are completed by 6:00 am after which the devotees are allowed to enter the sanctum to see the original form of the deity's idol.

The evening ritual begins with a number of bathing services to the moolavar; the prominent ones are Chandanabhisheka (abhisheka with water mixed with sandalwood powder) and Sahasrakalasabhisheka (abhisheka with water from thousand metal pots). All the three food offerings (Balabhoga, Rajabhoga, and night offering) are served to the deity at a time to compensate their omission during the day. This festival was observed elaborately in the ancient days and at least 40 inscriptions record the gifts made by various people on this occasion.

==== Narasimha Jayanti ====
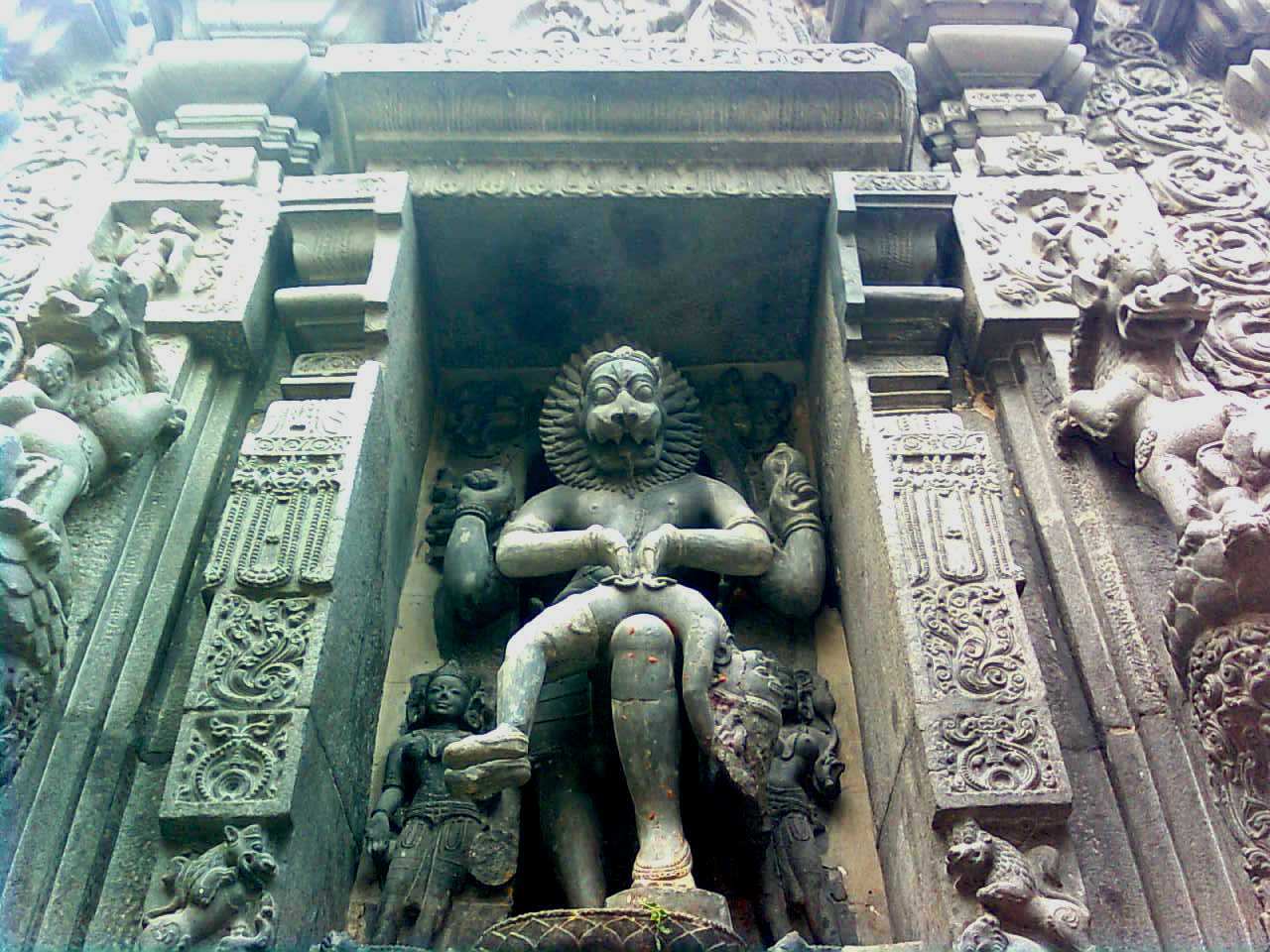
A statue of Narasimha killing Hiranyakashipu on the walls of the temple's sanctum. Kalinga-style sculpture.

Narasimha Jayanti is celebrated on the fourteenth day of the first half of the Vaisakha month (Vaisakha Suddha Chaturdasi). As Vishnu manifested as Narasimha from a pillar in the evening of this day to save Prahlada, the celebrations are held in the twilight. An inscription dated 1287 CE recorded the arrangements made by Raghavanayaka and his grandson for the food offerings to the deity for this day. Another one dated 1356 CE notes a donation of 20 ganda madas on Vaisakha Suddha Chaturdasi for food offerings. (Note: Ganda mada is the name given to an ordinary gold coin in the currency system of medieval Orissa.) The celebrations commence at around 6:00 pm. Most of the rituals carried out in the sanctum are the same as that of an ordinary day. However, the Rajabhoga is served late in the evening. Respite is given after the sacred bath and selected chapters of the temple's legend related to the manifestation of Narasimha are read out. The utsava idol of the deity is placed on a special prepared seat in the assembly hall throughout the event.

==== Navaratrotsava ====
The ten day Dussehra festival is celebrated as Navaratrotsava (Festival of nine nights) with Vijayadashami being the last day. These occur in the month of Ashvin and are conducted for the glory of the principal goddess Lakshmi. For the first nine days of the month, special rituals are carried out in Lakshmi's shrine in the temple. The utsava idol of the goddess, referred to as Chaturbhuja Thayar, is taken round the temple and is placed on a seat in the assembly hall. Sri Sukta is read aloud while performing a sacred bath to the deity. This is then followed by Pushpapuja (flower worship) and final offering. On the last day, Shami tree (prosopis cineraria) is worshipped and the deity is taken around the village on the hill. Elephant vehicle is used for the same and it marks the end of the celebrations.

==== Kamadahana ====
Kamadahana (Burning of desire) occurs on the full moon day in the month of Phalguna. It is considered as an auxiliary festival (not specified by ancient texts) of the temple. Followers of Sri Vaishnavism consider Kamadahana as a self-purification ceremony; it bears no relation with the legend of Shiva burning Kamadeva to ashes. (Note: After his wife Sati's death, Shiva lost interest in worldly activities and commenced a deep meditation. As the demon Tarakasura could be killed only by Shiva's son, the deities approached Kamadeva, the god of desire. Kamadeva was burnt to ashes by Shiva when he tried to disturb the penance and contemplate the latter to marry Sati's reincarnation Parvati. Shiva later restored Kamadeva's life and made him formless to answer the latter's wife Rati's prayers.) Dolotsava (swing ritual) is performed as a prelude to Kamadahana on the same day. It is celebrated to mark the death of the demon Holika. The importance given to this festival shows the influence of Orissan culture in Simhachalam.

Dolotsava starts in the afternoon as the deity's utsava idol is brought to the garden located at the foot of the hill. The deity is made to occupy a special seat and red powder is sprinkled on him as the priests chant the hymns. This procedure is referred to as Churnotsavam. The deity is then placed on the swing and are moved to and fro in a ceremonial way. The Kamadahana ceremony begins at 8:00 pm at a small hut built near the entrance of the temple. The hut houses the deity as the priests conduct a fire ritual. They offer sacrifices in an elaborate manner to burn every aspect of desire. The hut is then burnt, symbolically representing the annihilation of Kama (desire). This ceremony is one of the important utsavas conducted in the temple.

=== Other festivals ===
==== Krishna Janmashtami ====
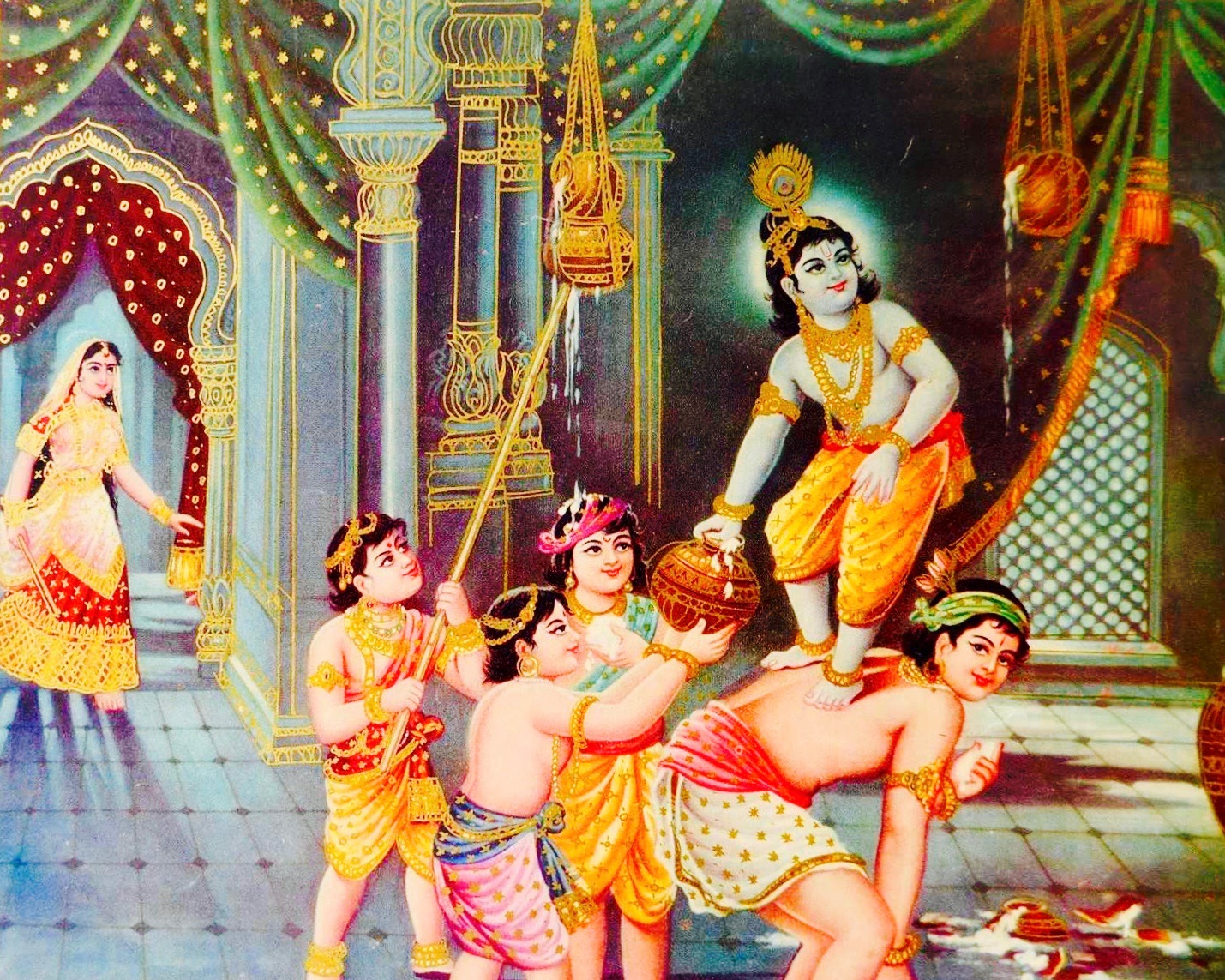
A painting depicting one of Krishna's childhood pranks of stealing butter.

Krishna Janmashtami is an important utsava in the temple which celebrates the birth of Krishna, the eighth avatar of Vishnu. It occurs on the eighth day of the dark fortnight of Sravana month. An inscription dated 1233 CE records a gift of 100 cows to provide milk to the temple's deity from that year's Janmashtami onwards. The utsava idol of Andal is taken round the temple and then made to occupy an ivory throne. After completing the bathing formalities and prayers, the chapter related to Krishna's birth in Bhagavata Purana is read aloud along with few sections of the Dravida Prabandha.

To glorify the pranks Krishna made in his childhood, Utlotsava (basket festival) is celebrated. For the purpose, a basket with a kalasa and a coconut is tied near the precincts of the temple. Young people are challenged to break the basket which keeps eluding them. At the end of the festival, milk offered to the deity is distributed among the devotees. As the temple's practices are influenced by the Dravida Sampradaya, Utlotsava is celebrated a day after Janmashtami. It differs from the tradition of Telugu people, who celebrate Utlotsava as a part of Janmashtami on the same day.

==== Karthika Deepavali ====
Karthika Deepavali is a festival of lights celebrated on the full moon day of Karthika month. On this occasion, an array of innumerable oil lamps are used to decorate the temple. An inscription dated 1270 CE records Chittana Gopala's gift of 50 cows, two akhandadipas (perpetual lamps) and stands supporting them. Another one dated 1278 CE records a gift of 47 cows by Allada Nayaka. Festival begins in the evening. 12 earthen containers with oil and wick are placed on a mandala (zone). Eight of the twelve lamps are dedicated to the guardians of the directions. The remaining four are dedicated to Brahma, Narasimha, Shesha and Garuda. These four lamps are placed at the cardinal points of the temple.

In the last phase, a hut made of dried plantain leaves is erected. The utsava idol is taken around the temple and brought to the hut where fire worship takes place. Incense and camphor are offered to the deity and the hut is burnt. Amidst the recital of hymns, the deity is taken round the burning hut thrice and is taken back to the temple. However, there is no epigraphical evidence available in the temple which specifies the way this festival is celebrated.

==== Giripradakshina ====
Giripradakshina is an annual festival celebrated on the full moon day of the Ashadha month. It is based on the custom that the devotees can receive Narasimha's blessings by circumambulating around the hill on which he is seated. Devotees, majority of them hailing from the countryside, observe a fast on the day and offer pradakshinas to the hill. They cover a distance of 30,000 metres (98,000 ft) and pay a visit to the sanctum after which they have dinner. Those who cannot afford to walk around the hill offer 108 pradakshinas in the temple. Another similar festival in Simhachalam is Grama pradakshina, where the utsava idol is taken to the villages nearby in a procession. An inscription dated 1242 CE records provision by Purushottama Nayaka for conducting this festival. Grama pradakshina is believed to be based on Faith; people hoped that the utsava idol's entry would bring prosperity to the village and its inmates.

==== Minor festivals ====
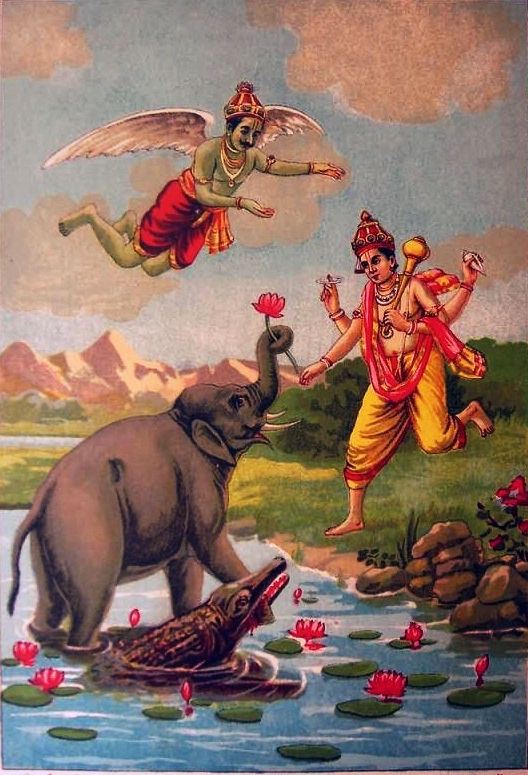
Makaraveta festival, which occurs on a day after Makar Sankranti, celebrates Gajendra Moksha (pictured), the legend of Vishnu saving an elephant devoted to him from a crocodile.

The minor festivals of the temple include Vaarotsavas (weekly festivals), Pakshotsavas (fortnightly festivals), Masotsavas (monthly festivals). There are two specific phases in these festivals: the Thiruveedhi festival where the utsava idol is taken on a procession and the performance of the appropriate service to the deity. These festivals also include the ones performed during the Grahanakalas (eclipses), Nakshatrotsavas (star festivals), Sankranthi (selstices) and Vishuvas (equinexes). The Pakshotsavas are held usually on the eleventh day (Ekadashi) of the two fortnights of every month. Many inscriptions have recorded the donations by various people to the temple on the occasion of Ekadashi days. The most important one among the Pakshotsavas is the Jalasayana Ekadashi. It is believed that Vishnu retires to sleep on the serpent bed for four months, starting from that day (the 11th day of the former fortnight of Ashadha) until Uttana Dwadasi (the 12th day of the former fortnight of Karthika).

Every month, special festivals are conducted in honour of the deity when one of the few auspicious nakshatras (stars) appear, which are known as Nakshatrotsavas. Vaishnavites consider Mrigashira, Punarvasu, Uttara and Sravana very auspicious among the 27 nakshatras. Sankaramanas, the festivals corresponding to the movement of sun in the heaven, are celebrated in the temple. Makar Sankranti and Karthika Sankranti are the major ones, followed by the relatively minor Vishnu Sankranti. Makaraveta (crocodile hunt) is celebrated a day after Makar Sankranthi. In the temple tank, the scenario of the Hindu legend Gajendra Moksha is recreated with the help of a mock crocodile hunt by the utsava idol. Teppotsavam (floating festival) is celebrated at the end of the Pausha month.

In addition, Simhachalam celebrates two annual festivals: Dhanurmasotsava and Adhyayanotsava. Dhanurmasotsava celebrates Andal's attempts to marry Lord Ranganatha, a form of Vishnu. She observed tapas (self disciplined meditation) for 30 days before being married unto the Lord. Those 30 days are celebrated for the entire month of Margashira by a special ritual at the Andal shrine. In Adhyayanotsava (study festival), the deity is conducted to the assembly hall where he is worshipped for 20 days. The 4000 verses of the Tamil text Naalayira Divya Prabhandham is read aloud along with other sacred texts, which lends the festival its name. This festival is divided into two phases: the first phases lasts for the first ten mornings of the fortnight. The eleventh day, which happens to be Vaikuntha Ekadashi, begins the second phase. The deity, seated on a specially made porch, is worshipped in the night during the second phase. Special services suited to each incarnation of Vishnu are offered during this phase.

== Significance ==
=== Religious and national importance ===
Simhachalam is one of the 32 Narasimha temples in Andhra Pradesh which are important pilgrimage centres alongside Ahobilam, Antarvedi, Kadiri and Mangalagiri among others. It was regarded as an important centre of Vaishnavism in the medieval period along with Srikurmam and others. Diana L Eck, the author of India: A Sacred Geography (2012) noted that at Simhachalam, Narasimha's "frightening" violence is softened by worshipping him in conjunction with Varaha, who is usually considered as a peaceful deity. Varaha Narasimha is referred to with many names such as Simhadrinatha, Simhadri Appanna and Apparu. It is believed that the deity is capable of giving progeny to women and fulfilling wishes of devotees. It was observed that parents who begot children after praying here named their children after the Simhachalam temple and its deity.

Simhachalam is the second-largest after Tirumala in Andhra Pradesh in terms of income earned; as of 2013, the earnings stood at ₹60 crores (600 million). It is the first temple in the north coastal region of Andhra Pradesh and second in the entire state (after the Satyanarayana temple in Annavaram) to follow the cashless system. Point of sale systems. provided by the State Bank of India and Andhra Bank, are used for accepting donations and gifts from devotees.

=== Literary mentions ===
Simhachalam temple found many literary references and lyrical works dedicated by anonymous writers; some of the latter are preserved in the Government Oriental Manuscripts Library, Chennai. The earliest known literary mention of the temple is found in Lakshmi Narasimhapurana written by Telugu poet Yerrapragada. He mentioned it as a place of pilgrimage visited by a sage on a holy tour. But Yerrapragada did not describe the temple as the work was focused on Ahobilam temple. Srinatha described the Simhadri Thirunaal event, a festive gathering at the temple. He described the various classes of ladies assembled at the gathering in his Chatuvulu (extempore poems).

Krishnamacharyulu wrote devotional vachanas (prose) in praise of Varaha Narasimha of Simhachalam. Written in churnika style, they are known as Simhagiri Vachanas and Simhagiri Narahari Vachanas. He was the first Telugu poet to use bhakti (devotion) in Telugu literature and was succeeded by Annamacharya, Kancherla Gopanna and Tyagaraja. Simhagiri Vachanas had features of the Shatakam-style of poetry. It is believed that Krishnamacharyulu was inspired by Ramanuja's Gadyatrayam and opted for prose to reach the ordinary people. Krishnamacharyulu wrote 400,000 vachanas on copper plates of which 75 are available after he left for Srirangam. The vachanas begin with an invocation to the deity. Simhagiri Vachanas are recited by the local villagers near Simhachalam during special occasions. These vachanas also inspired many other poets to compose similar devotional prose including Pothana and Srinatha; the latter introduced 12 laudatory pieces showing Krishnamacharyulu's impact in his works Bhimeswara Purana and Kasikandham.

Krishnadevaraya mentioned his visit to Simhachalam in his epic poem Amuktamalyada. The king's visit was also documented by poets Allasani Peddana and Dhurjati in Manucharitra and Krishnaraya Vijaya respectively. The latter particularly mentions the event of Krishnadevaraya erecting a pillar of victory at Simhachalam. Pingali Suranna makes a mention of Simhachalam in Kalapurnodayam as a part of Manikandhara's pilgrims. Telugu poets Kuchimanchi Timmakavi and Kattamuri Kameswara Kavi composed prabandhas in favour of Varaha Narasimha, named Simhasaila Mahatyam and Lakshmi Narasimha Charita respectively. The story of Muslim invaders attacking Simhachalam and their defeat was documented in a satiric way by Kurmanatha Kavi in his work Simhadri Narasimha Satakam. This work is popular among Narasimha's devotees and is cited to show the efficacy of devotion towards him.

== Bibliography ==
- Acharya, Sabita (1991). Anthropology of pilgrimage of lord Jagannath at Puri and lord Narasimha at Simhachalam (Doctor of Philosophy). Utkal University. hdl:10603/118540.
- Buchanan, Francis (1988). A Journey from Madras Through the Countries of Mysore, Canara, and Malabar, for the Express Purpose of Investigating the State of Agriculture, Arts and Commerce, the Religion, Manners, and Customs: The History, Natural and Civil and Antiquities. Asian Educational Services. ISBN 978-81-2060-386-8.
- Dhody, Chandan Lal (1995). The Adhyātma Rāmāyaṇa: Concise English Version. M. D. Publications Pvt. Ltd. ISBN 978-81-8588-077-8.
- Drew, A. J. (2003). A Wiccan Bible: Exploring the Mysteries of the Craft from Birth to Summerland. Career Press. ISBN 978-1-56414-666-3.
- Eck, Diana L (2012). India: A Sacred Geography. Potter/TenSpeed/Harmony. ISBN 978-0-385-53191-7.
- Hudson, D Dennis (2008). The Body of God: An Emperor's Palace for Krishna in Eighth-Century Kanchipuram. Oxford University Press. ISBN 978-0-19-970902-1.
- Knapp, Stephen (2009). Spiritual India Handbook. Jaico Publishing House. ISBN 978-81-8495-024-3.
- Krishna, K. Venkata (2010). A Study Of Narasimha Cult In Sanskrit Literature (Doctor of Philosophy). Sri Venkateswara University. hdl:10603/109961.
- Krishna, Nanditha (2009). Book of Vishnu. Penguin Books. ISBN 978-81-8475-865-8.
- Kumari, M. Krishna (1990). Social and Cultural Life in Medieval Andhra. Discovery Publishing House. ISBN 81-7141-102-9.
- Ninan, M. M. (2008). The Development of Hinduism. Madathil Mammen Ninan. ISBN 978-1-4382-2820-4.
- Patnaik, Nihar Ranjan (1997). Economic History of Orissa. Indus Publishing. ISBN 978-81-7387-075-0.
- Reddy, P. Bhaskar (1991). The Inscriptions Of Simhachalam A Cultural Study (Doctor of Philosophy). Sri Venkateswara University. hdl:10603/106055.
- Roy, Sumita (1998) [1996]. Poet Saints of India. Sterling Publishers Pvt. Ltd. ISBN 978-81-2071-883-8.
- Meena, V. (1974). Temples of South India. Harikumar Arts. ISBN 4-567-14-991-2.
- Sridhar, V. V. (2009). సింహాచలం శ్రీ వరాహ లక్ష్మీనరసింహస్వామివారి క్షేత్రమహత్యం [The glory of Simhachalam's Varaha Narasimha] (in Telugu). Sri Jwala Central Trust.
