= Simhachalam Hill Range =

Mountain range in Andhra Pradesh, India

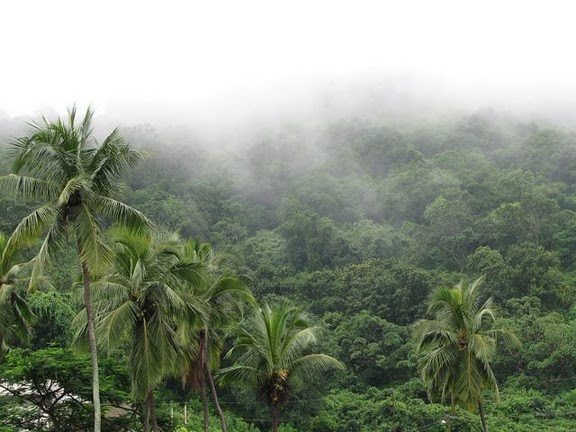
- Simhachalam Hills

Highest point
- Elevation: 377 m (1,237 ft)
- Coordinates: 17°45′39″N 83°15′59″E

Naming
- Native name: Simhachalam Kondalu (Telugu)

Geography
- Location within Visakhapatnam
- Location: Visakhapatnam, Andhra Pradesh, India
- Parent range: Eastern Ghats

The Simhachala Hill Range, with the anglicised name Simhachalam Hills, are a towering mountain range (377 m) in the city of Visakhapatnam, in Andhra Pradesh state, southern India. It is one of the hill ranges in Andhra Pradesh and in the Eastern Ghats.

== Geography ==
The Simhachalam Hills form part of the eastern ranges of the Eastern Ghats system. These hills cover an area of 32 km.

== History ==
The Simhachalm Hill Range has a lot of rich history. The famous Varaha Lakshmi Narasimha temple is located here. The Chalukya period Radha Madhava Swamy temple and some old Buddhist monuments are also found here.

== Devotional ==
The hills house many temples including the Varaha Lakshmi Narasimha temple and other smaller ones; every year a festival is held called the Giri Pradakshina, where Hindu devotees walk 35 km around the hill.

== About ==
The neighborhoods of Visakhapatnam city situated near the hill range are Adavivaram, Akkayyapalem, Balayya Sastri Layout, Gopalapatnam, Hanumanthavaka, Kailasapuram, Madhavadhara, Narasimha Nagar, Prahaladapuram, and Seethammadhara.

== Flora and fauna ==
Simhachalam Hills protected Visakhapatnam city environmental hazards and Andhra University has found 74 varieties of flora and 200 species.

== Trekking ==
There is a popular trail leading to the Varaha Lakshmi Narasimha Swamy Temple atop Simhachalam Hill. The trek begins near Hanumanthavaka junction and the route offers panoramic views of the city and the Eastern Ghats.
