= Sri Kantha Krishnamacharyulu =

Sri Kantha Krishnamacharyulu or Krishnamayya (12th-13th century CE) was the official songmaster, poet and bard of the Simhachalam Temple, in Visakhapatnam, Andhra Pradesh, and a Telugu composer who composed around 400,000 keertana songs, in praise of Sri Varahalakshmi Narasimha Swamy, the presiding deity of the temple. He was contemporary to the Kakatiya king, Orugallu. There is a mention about Krishnamaacharyulu, his compositions and his miraculous life in Prataaapa rudra charitraand siddheswara charitra

Currently, Annamacharya of the 15th century is regarded as first vaggeyakara in Telugu. But, that position belongs to Krishnamayya, as he lived 300 years prior to Annamacharya. Musicologists and scholars believe that Krishnayya's writings bore an indelible influence on later poet-composers. For instance, the song, ‘Ye Kulajudaina Nemi’ was inspired by Krishnamayya. His compositions were rendered in simple prose format but encased the highest Vaishanavism. There is no linguistic ornamentation, so to say. He is venerated as the father of sankeertana by the later saint-poets of Telugu language. He was supposed to have carried his four lakh vachanams (prosody) on copper plates when he went on a pilgrimage. Of these, only 200 have been retrieved so far and are in existence as of now. They are full of devotional fervour and have been collected in a book form and set to tunes by vinukondaMurali krishna, a musician and a musicologist of Visakhapatnam.

== Compositions ==
Testimonies stated that Krishnammacharya sang his compositions tunefully at the temple, making the compositions fall under the Vaggeyakara (verbal) category. To this day, lines from his vachanam are rendered musically as a part of the regular ritualistic puja at the temple of Simhachala. However, there are a few detractors who does not categorise Krishnamaacharya under the Vaggeyakara as his compositions were prosody (vachanam/gadyam).

The Simhagiri Vachanams were restricted to libraries until now, where more research from the sources were published.

The Keertans of Krishnamayya were composed in three different styles: traditional padhyams, keerthans, and in a special style fusing modern trend to suit the tastes of all generations.

== Krishnamayya project ==
It was believed that he composed over four hundred thousand vachanas in praise of Lord Sri. Varaha Lakshmi Narasimha. Only 200 are known to have survived to this day. His Simhagiri Vachanas are still recited in Simhachalam in Vizag. His works were perhaps available to Annamayya. The Krishnamayya foundation of Visakhapatnam had launched a project, on 4 July 2009, in the name of Saint Krishnamayya viz. "Krishnamayya project" under the Chairmanship of the Hon. H. H. Dr. P Ananda Gajapathi Raju former Education Minister of A.P and the hereditary trustee of Sri Varaha lakshmi Narasimha Swamy vari Devastanam. With a mission to popularise the life and works of Srikantha Krishnamaachaaryulu, a project was launched by Dr. Pusapaati Ananada Gajapathi Raju, the hereditary trustee of Simhachalam Devasthanam on 4 July 2009 Krishnamayya project is the brain child of Sri. Vinukonda Murali Mohan, S/O Jogarao Sri. Murali Mohan is the creator and author of Krishnamayya Project.
