= Panchavatee Hanuman Temple =

Panchavatee
- பஞ்சமுக அஞ்சனேயஸ்வாமி
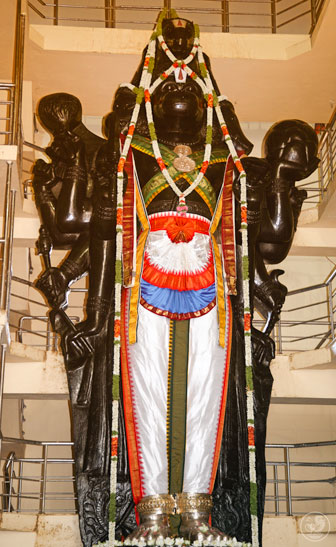

- Location within Puducherry

Religion
- Affiliation: Hinduism

Location
- Country: India
- Coordinates: 12.009549°N 79.772222°E

Architecture
- Elevation: 10.9728 m (36 ft)

Panchavatee Jayamangala Panchamukha Sri Anjaneyaswamy (Tamil: பஞ்சவடீ ஜெயமங்கள பஞ்சமுக ஸ்ரீ அஞ்சனேயஸ்வாமி) is a temple located 9 km from Pondicherry, India.

The temple is situated near Pondicherry, in the village of Pappanchavadi, Vanur Taluk, Villupuram District.
