= Narasimha Jayanti =

Hindu festival

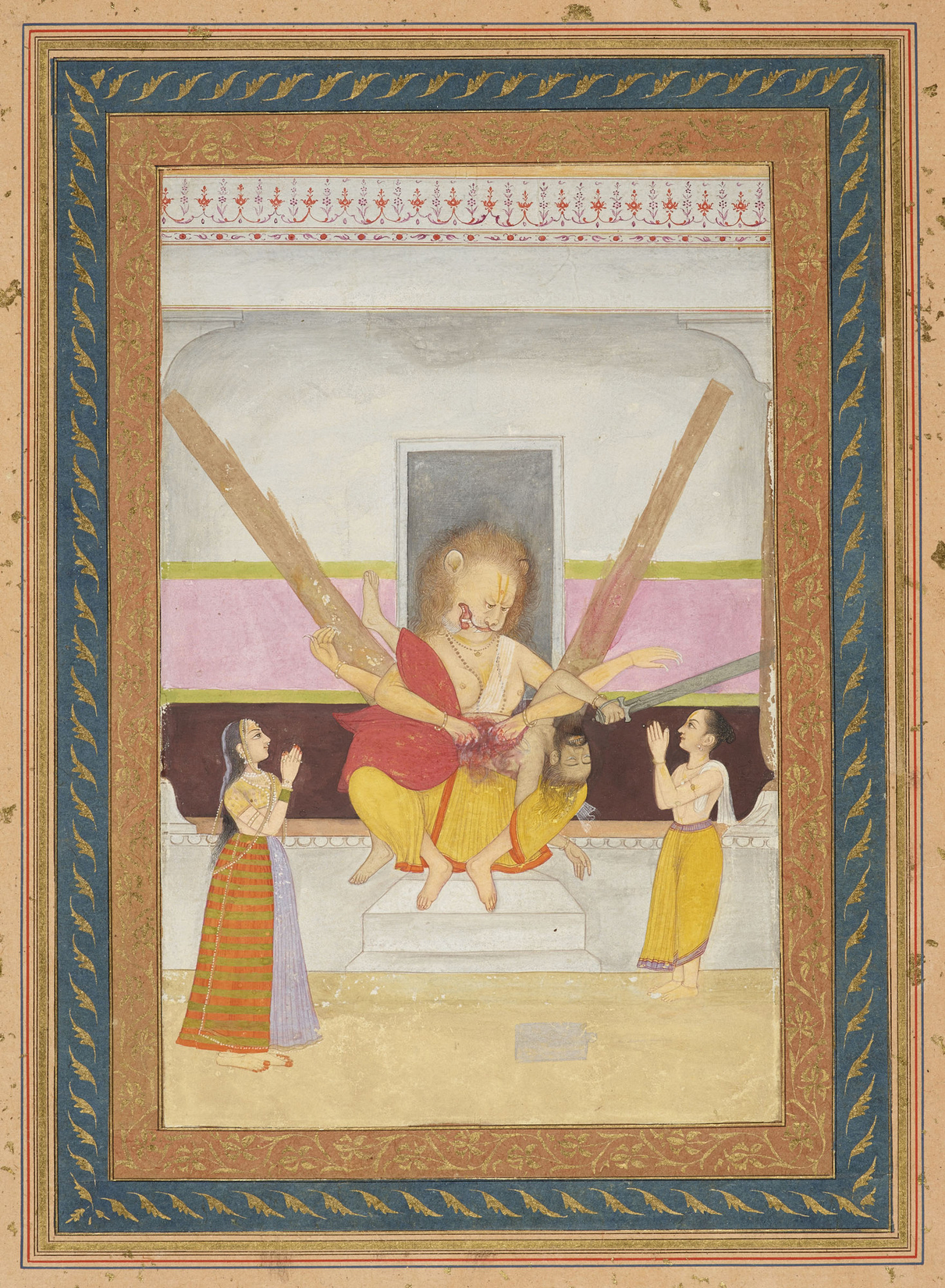
- 18th century painting of Narasimha slaying Hiranyakashipu
- Observed by: Hindus, especially Vaishnavas
- Significance: Vishnu's incarnation as Narasimha
- Observances: Puja, fasting, temple rituals, offering charity, reading of Prahlada Charitra
- Date: Vaishakha Shukla Chaturdashi (14th day of Hindu month Vaisakha)
- Frequency: Annual

Narasimha Jayanti (Sanskrit: नरसिंहजयंती, romanized: Narasiṃhajayantī, lit. 'Victory of Narasimha') is a Hindu festival that is celebrated on the fourteenth day of the Hindu month of Vaisakha (April-May). Hindus regard this as the day the deity Vishnu assumed his fourth avatar in the form of a "man-lion", known as Narasimha, to vanquish the oppressive asura king Hiranyakashipu and protect his devotee Prahlada. This event is understood to have taken place in Ahobilam, and other areas when Narasimha is witness to devotees. The legend of Narasimha represents the victory of knowledge over ignorance and the protection offered by God to his devotees.

== Legend ==
In Hindu mythology, Hiranyakashipu was the first incarnation of Jaya, one of the two doorkeepers of Vishnu's abode of Vaikuntha. After being cursed by the Four Kumaras, along with his brother, Vijaya, he chose to be born as an enemy of Vishnu thrice, rather than as a devotee of the deity seven times. After the death of his brother, Hiranyaksha, at the hands of Varaha, the third avatara of Vishnu, Hiranyakashipu swore revenge. The king performed a severe penance to propitiate the creator deity, Brahma, until the latter appeared to grant him a boon. The asura desired the inability to be slain neither inside his house nor outside, by day nor night, by any weapon, neither on the ground nor in the sky, by neither men nor beasts, deva nor asura, nor any being created by Brahma. He also asked for rulership of all living beings and the three worlds. His wish granted, Hiranyakashipu overran the three worlds with his invincibility and his forces, seizing the throne of Indra in Svarga, and subjugating all beings, except the Trimurti, under his rule.

Hiranyakashipu's son, Prahlada, grew devoted to Vishnu, due to spending his childhood at Narada's ashrama. Angered that his son prayed to his sworn enemy, Hiranyakashipu attempted to indoctrinate him under various teachers, including Shukra, but to no avail. The king determined that such a son must die. He employed poison, snakes, elephants, fire, and warriors to slay Prahlada, but the boy was saved by praying to Vishnu on each attempt. When the royal priests attempted to indoctrinate the prince once more, he converted the other pupils to Vaishnavism. The priests created a trishula (trident) to murder the boy, but it slew them instead, after which Prahlada restored them to life. Shambarasura and Vayu were tasked with killing him, but failed. Finally, the asura had his son tied to nooses of snakes, and hurled into the ocean, with mountains launched to crush him. Prahlada remained unscathed. Frustrated, Hiranyakashipu demanded to know where Vishnu resided, and Prahlada responded that he was omnipresent. He asked his son if Vishnu lived in a pillar of his chamber, and the latter affirmed in response. Furious, the king smashed the pillar with his mace, whence Narasimha, part-man, part-lion, appeared before him. The avatara dragged Hiranyakashipu to the doorway of the palace, and ripped him apart with his claws, his form placed upon his lap, during twilight. Thus, circumventing the boon granted to the asura king, Narasimha was able to rescue his devotee, and restore order to the universe.

== History ==
Narasimha Jayanti is referenced in the Padma Purana and Skanda Purana as Narasimha Chaturdashi. The worship of Narasimha has been present in South India for millennia, with the Pallava dynasty popularising the sect and its practices. Inscriptions have also been found referring to the occasion dating back to the Vijayanagara Empire.

== Religious practices and traditions ==
Narasimha Jayanti is primarily observed by Vaishnavas, the adherents of Vishnu, in the South Indian states of Karnataka, Andhra Pradesh, and northern Tamil Nadu, where the veneration of Narasimha is popular. Narasimha and Lakshmi Narasimha temples throughout the aforementioned regions hold special pujas in honour of the deity during various time periods of the occasion. In the household, the shodashopachara puja is performed in the morning, and the panchopachara puja is performed in the evening, both by men.

Members of the Sri Vaishnava tradition traditionally observe fasting until the evening, and consume food after prayer. A beverage called panakam is prepared from jaggery and water, and is distributed to the Brahmins during the festivities.

In Karnataka, community feasts are organised by certain temples to celebrate the occasion.

=== Bhagavata Mela ===
Every year on Narasimha Jayanti, a traditional folk dance known as the bhagavata mela is publicly performed in Melattur, a village in Tamil Nadu. The term "bhagavata" refers to the Bhagavata Purana, a prominent Hindu text in the Vaishnava tradition, while "mela" refers to traditional dancers or singers. Thus, this folk dance enacts stories from the Bhagavata Purana using specific dance techniques and karnatāka musical style. One particular performance that is "noteworthy for its dramatic impact and ritual significance" is the story of Prahlada and Narasimha.

== See also ==
- Krishna Janmashtami
- Rama Navami
- Hanuman Jayanti
