= Simhadri Narasimha Satakam =

18th-century compilation of Telugu poems

Simhadri Narasimha Satakam (Telugu: సింహాద్రి నారసింహ శతకము) is a compilation of Telugu poems by Gogulapati Kurmanatha Kavi in the 18th century. He wrote the Satakam extempore in praise of Lord Varaha Narasimha of Simhachalam.

== Author ==
Gogulapati Kurmanatha Kavi was a Brahmin, born to Buchanna and Gauramamba. He has two brothers Venkanna and Kamanna. He was born in Vizianagaram district near Ramatirtham around 1720. After primary education he joined Vizianagaram Samsthanam as temple servant and posted at Ramatirtham, Padmanabham, Simachalam and Srikurmam.

He was the Court (Asthana) poet of First Pusapati Ananda Gajapati Raju of Vizianagaram and wrote Mrutyunjaya Vilasam, Simhadri Narasimha Satakam, Lakshminarayana Samvadam and Sundarimani Satakam.

He used to live in Devupalli village in his last days and died in 1790. Adidam Surakavi and Chatrati Lakshminarasimha Kavi are his contemporaries.

== Publications ==
- It was initially published by Andhra Vignana Samithi, Vizianagaram in 1941 with detailed foreword by Sriman Kari Narayanacharulu.
- It was published first time by Simhachalam Devasthanam on 30 December 1962 with detailed analysis and foreword written by Pantula Lakshmi Narayana Sastry, head of Telugu department, Maharajah Sanskrit College, Vizianagaram.
- It was published second time by Simhachalam Devasthanam on 5 December 1983 with foreword by T.P. Sriramchandracharya, head of Telugu department, Mrs.A.V.N.College, Visakhapatnam.
