= Madhusudana =

Epithet of Vishnu

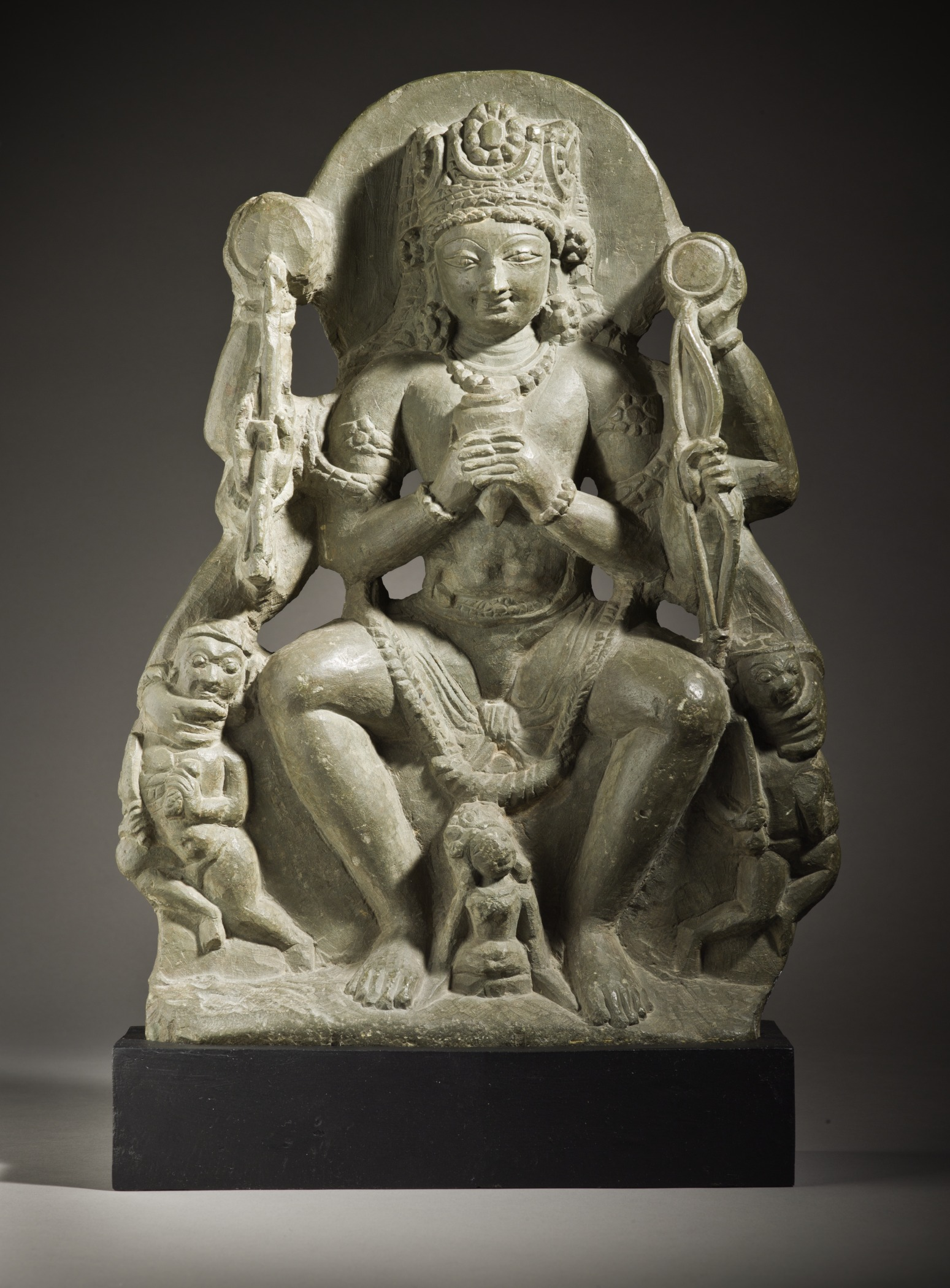
Sculpture of Vishnu slaying Madhu and Kaitabha

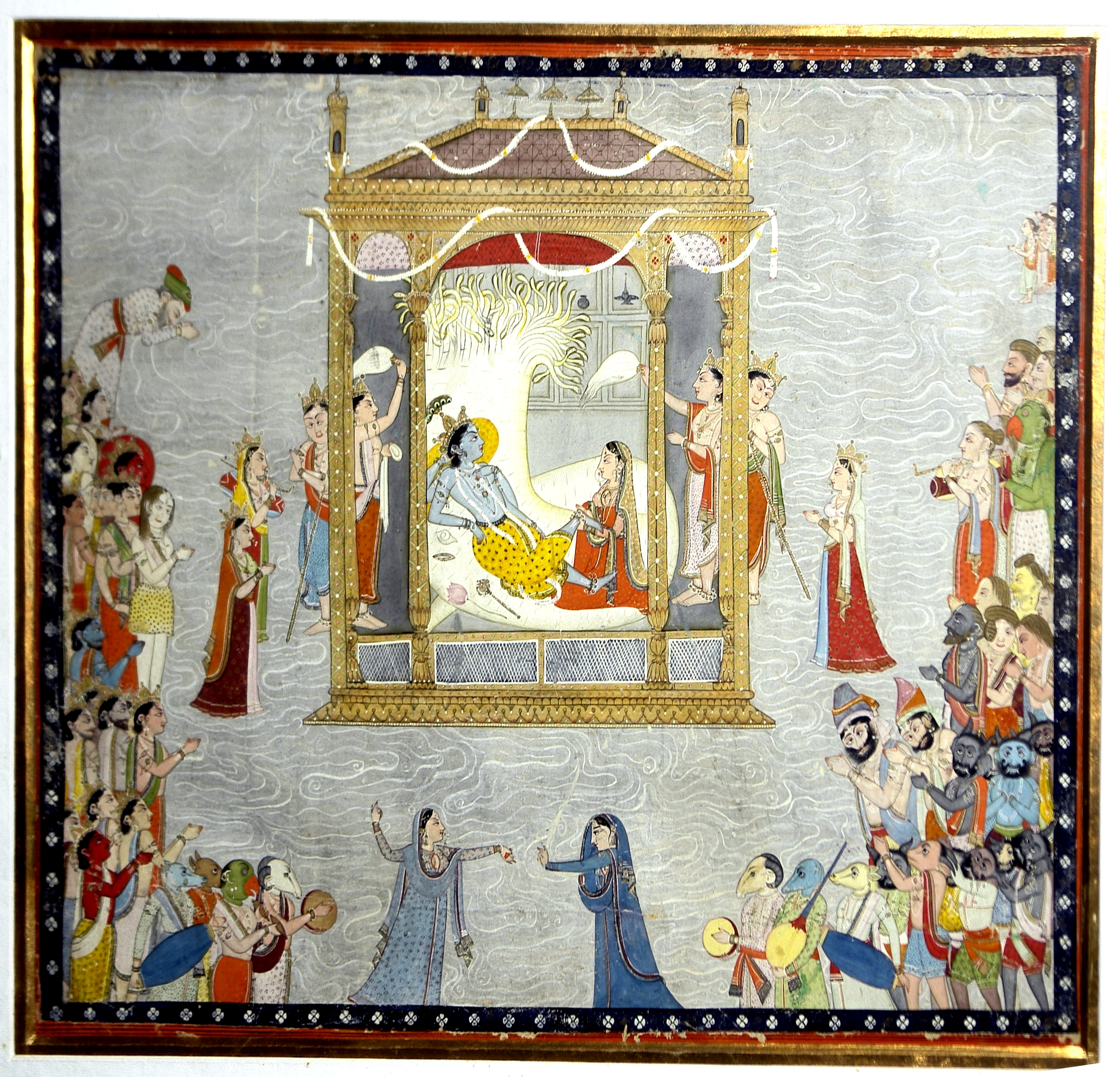
Madhusudana (Vishnu) and Madhusudana Kāminī (Lakshmi)

Madhusudana (Sanskrit: मधुसूदन, romanized: Madhusūdana) is an epithet of Vishnu and is the 73rd name in the Vishnu Sahasranama.

According to Adi Sankara's commentary on the Vishnu Sahasranama, Madhusudana means the "destroyer of Madhu".

== Literature ==
The death of Madhu and the origin of the epithet is described in the Padma Purana:

Then Madhu, screened with darkness, quickly disappeared. Through his illusion he dropped a hundred mountains on (the body of) Viṣṇu. Then in the battle, getting into the darkness, he cut off the mountains, and angrily cut off his head with his (disc called) Sudarśana. Then gods like Brahmā and Śiva made him known as ‘Madhusūdana’ in the worlds.

— Padma Purana, Section 1, Chapter 72
