= Arunachalesvara Temple =

Hindu temple in Tiruvannamalai, Tamil Nadu, India

- Annamalaiyar Temple
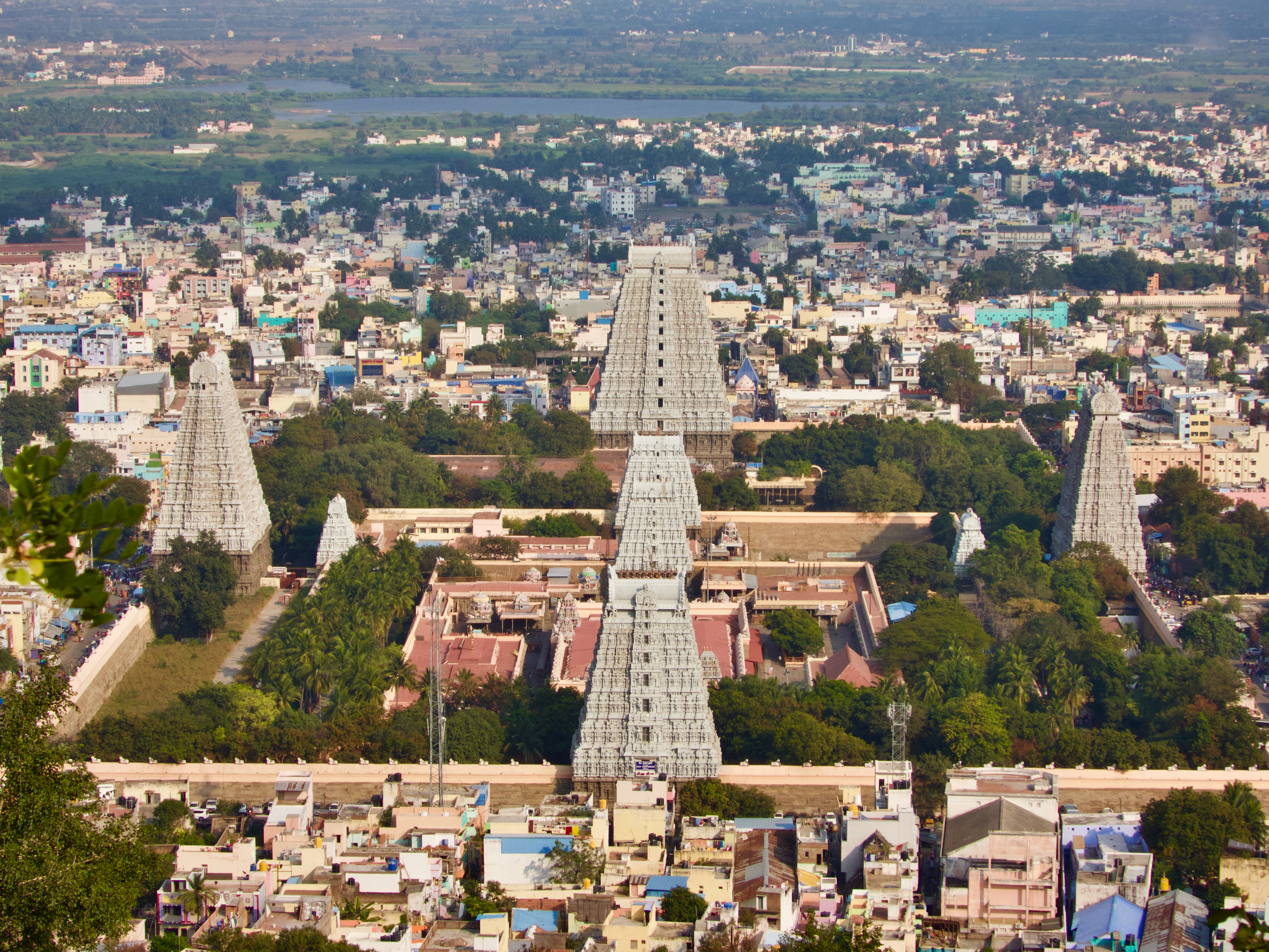
- View of the temple complex from the Arunachala hill

- Location within Tamil Nadu Arunachalesvara Temple (India)

Religion
- Affiliation: Hinduism
- District: Tiruvannamalai
- Deity: Annamalaiyar (Shiva); Unnamulai Ammai (Parvati)
- Festivals: Karthigai Deepam; Maha Shivaratri; Thai Thiruvudal Utsavam; Maasi Magam; Aani Thirumanjanam; Margazhi Thiruvathirai; Thiruvempavai Utsavam
- Features: Temple tank: 360 sacred tirthas

Location
- Location: Tiruvannamalai
- State: Tamil Nadu
- Country: India
- Coordinates: 12°13′53.76″N 79°4′1.92″E

Architecture
- Type: Tamil architecture
- Creator: Cholas
- Completed: 9th century CE

Website
- annamalaiyar.hrce.tn.gov.in

The Arunachalesvara Temple or Annamalaiyar Temple, is a Hindu temple dedicated to Shiva and Parvati, located at the foothills of the Arunachala hill in Tiruvannamalai, Tamil Nadu, India. It is regarded as one of the significant temples in the Tamil Shaivite tradition. It is one of the Pancha Bhuta Sthalams and is associated with the element of fire (Agni) among the five natural elements. The presiding deity of the temple is Annamalaiyar (meaning "the mountain that cannot be reached"), who is worshipped as the embodiment of the hill itself, and is represented by a lingam known as the Agni Lingam, symbolizing the element of fire. Parvathi, revered as Unnamulai ammai, is represented by the yoni, with her idol referred to as the Agni Yoni.

The temple is classified as one of the Paadal Petra Sthalams, one of the 276 sacred Saivite temples glorified in medieval Tamil Shaiva literature. It is celebrated in canonical Tamil devotional works such as the Tevaram composed by the Nayanars in 7th century CE, Tiruvempavai by Manikkavacakar in 9th century CE, and Tiruppukal by Arunagirinathar in the 14th century CE.

The present structure was built during the Chola Empire in the 9th century CE, while later expansions were done during the Vijayanagara rule (13th to 15th century CE). The temple complex covers 10 hectares, and is one of the largest in India. It has four large gopurams (ornamental gateway towers), with the east tower being the tallest at 66 m (217 ft) with 11 stories. The temple has numerous shrines, dedicated to various Hindu gods, and houses several large halls, the notable of which is the thousand-pillared hall built during the Vijayanagara rule. The temple is maintained and administered by the Hindu Religious and Charitable Endowments Department of the Government of Tamil Nadu.

The temple has six daily rituals, performed between 5:30 a.m. and 10:00 p.m., and twelve yearly festivals. During the Karthigai Deepam festival, celebrated during the purnima day in the Tamil month of Karthigai, and a large beacon is lit atop the Arunachala hill. The beacon, which can be seen from miles around, symbolizes the jyotirlinga form of Shiva, which extended as a pillar of fire. The event attracts million of pilgrims, who often circumambulate the hill called girivalam.

== Etymology ==
Annamalai is derived from a combination of two Tamil language words with "Anna" meaning "great" or "powerful" and "malai" meaning hill. Arunachala is derived from the Sanskrit words "Aruna" representing the rays of the Sun and "achala" meaning "unmoving". As Shiva is represented by the form of a large column of fire radiating from the hill, the names of the place came to represent the same.

== Mythology ==
According to the Shiva Purana, Brahma (god of creation) and Vishnu (god of preservation) had an argument over their supremacy. To settle the debate, Shiva took the form of jyotirlinga, a huge column of fire or light, stretching across the three worlds. Vishnu took the form of a boar and descended to locate the bottom of the column, while Brahma assumed the form of a swan to locate its top. Vishnu failed in his search and returned, honest about the outcome of his quest. Brahma chanced upon a thalampu flower in the midst of his ascent. Upon enquiry, he learned that the flower had been descending from the column for several years. He bade the flower to lie to Vishnu that he had seen the top of the column. The dishonesty of Brahma angered Shiva, causing him to curse Brahma that he would not be worshipped. He also declared that Vishnu would be eternally worshipped for his honesty. Shiva took the form of fire at the Arunachala hill in Tiruvannamalai, and later took the form of a lingam at the base of the hill.

According to Hindu mythology, Parvati once blindfolded Shiva, which led to the entire Earth being plunged in darkness. Shiva opened his third eye to shine light on the Earth. Realising her mistake, Parvati prayed for Shiva's forgiveness. Shiva directed her to go to Tiruvannamali and perform tapas at the ashram of sage Gautama. When Mahisasura disturbed her, she took the form of Durga, and killed the asura. Later, Shiva accepted her on the purnima day of the Tamil month of Karthigai. The Karthika Deepam festival is celebrated to commemorate the manifestation of Shiva as jyotirlinga, and his re-acceptance of Parvati.

== History ==
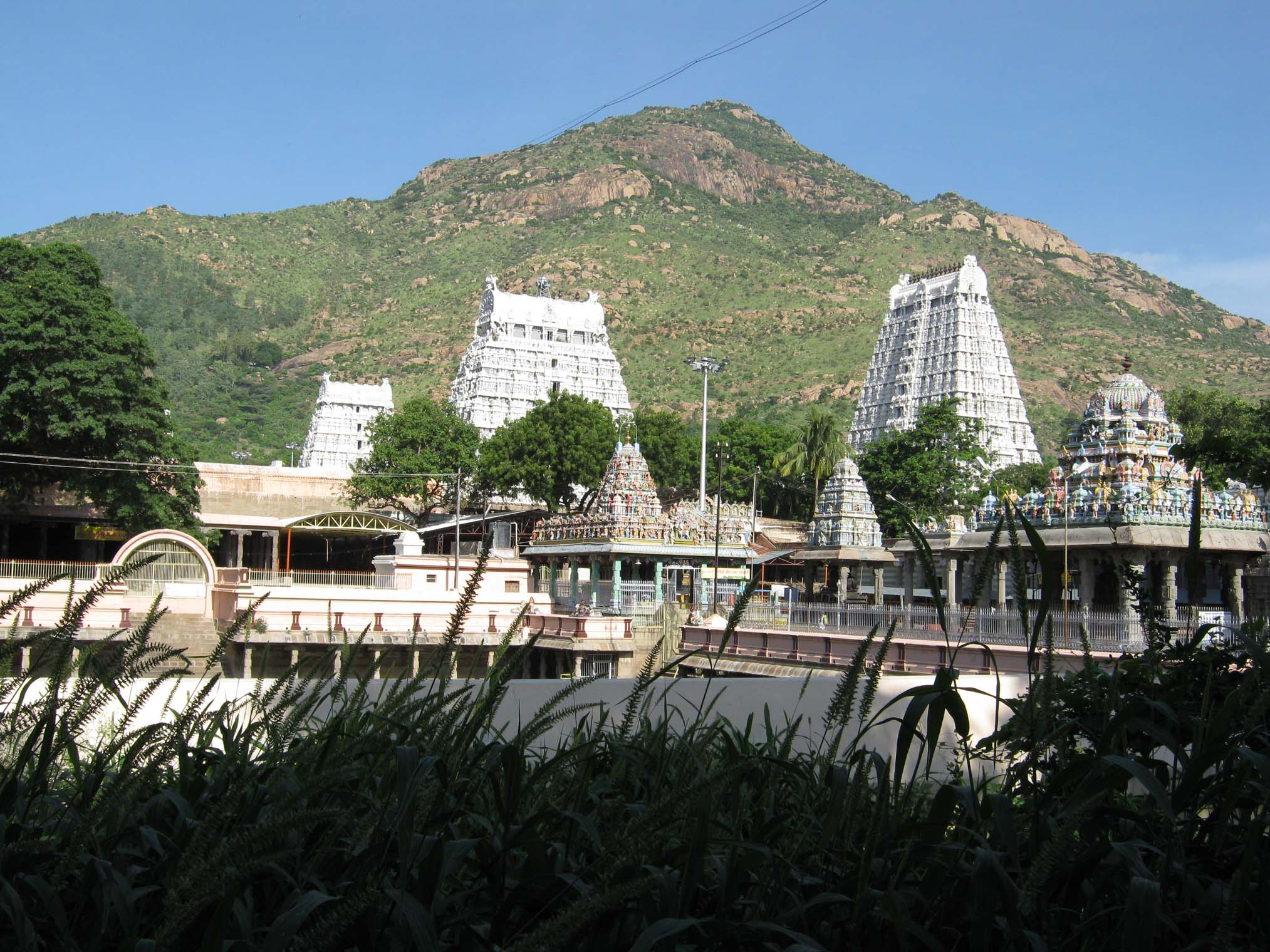
Arunachala hill with temple in the foreground

The deities are described in the Shaiva text of Tevaram from the 7th century CE. Sekkilhar, the author of the Periya Puranam, wrote that Appar and Sambandar worshipped Annamalaiyar in the temple. The present masonry of the temple dates back to the 9th century to the reign of the Cholas. Inscriptions found in the temple record gifts such as land, and cows given to the temple by various Chola kings. Further inscriptions from the temple indicate that before the 9th century CE, the region was under the reign of the Pallava Kings, who ruled from Kanchipuram. The Hoysalas made the region around the temple as their capital in 1328 CE.

The temple was located at a strategic location in the Vijayanagara Empire, connecting important pilgrimage centers and military routes. Inscriptions describe the expansion of the temple, and the town developing around the Annamalaiyar temple during the period. There are 48 inscriptions from the Sangama Dynasty (1336–1485 CE), two inscriptions from the Saluva Dynasty, and 55 inscriptions from the Tuluva Dynasty (1491–1570 CE) of the Vijayanagara Empire, describing various gifts to the temple by their respective rulers. Inscriptions from the period of Krishnadevaraya (1509–1529 CE), indicates patronage to the temple. Most of the Vijayanagara inscriptions are written in Tamil, with some in Kannada and Sanskrit.

The expansion of the temple and construction of the large gopuram at the eastern entrance began during the reign of Krishnadevaraya, and completed during the period of Sevappa Nayaka (1532–80 CE). The inscriptions indicate that the tower was built at the behest of Sivanesa and his brother Lokanatha in 1572 CE. The Tanjavuri Andhra Raja Charitamu mentions that Krishnadevaraya built the tower and the outer precincts of the temple. Nayak period texts such as Raghunathabhyudayam and Sangitha Sudha describe the towers. During the reign of Krishnadevaraya, the thousand pillared hall and a tank were constructed within the temple premises.

During the 17th century CE, the temple came under the dominion of the Carnatic Sultanate. Subsequently, the temple was besieged by various rulers such as Muraru Raya, Krishna Raya, Mrithis Ali Khan, and Burkat Ullakhan in succession. As European incursions progressed, Tiruvannamalai was attacked by the French and the English. The French occupied the town in 1757, and the temple along with the town later came under control of the British in 1760. In 1790, it was captured by Tipu Sultan, who ruled from 1750–99 CE. During the first half of the 19th century, the town along with the temple came under British rule.

After Indian Independence, the temple has been maintained by the Hindu Religious and Charitable Endowments Department of the Government of Tamil Nadu since 1951. In 2002, the Archaeological Survey of India declared the temple a national heritage monument and took over its stewardship. Following a litigation with the Supreme Court of India, the administration of the temple was given back to the Hindu Religious and Endowment Board. In the mid 20th century CE, the temple and the town were popularised in the Western World by the work of Ramana Maharshi (1879 CE–1950 CE). The cave where Ramana meditated is on the lower slopes of the Annamalai hills, with the Sri Ramana Ashram located further down at the foothill.

== Religious significance ==
The Arunachalesvara temple is one of the Pancha Bhuta Sthalams, which are five major Shiva temples, each representing a manifestation of a natural elements. The lingam in the shrine is referred to as the Agni Lingam, symbolising the element of fire (Agni) and representing the themes of duty, tapas (penance), self-sacrifice, and spiritual liberation.

Sambandar, a 7th-century CE Tamil poet, venerated Annamalaiyar and Unnamulai Amman in ten verses in Tevaram, compiled as the first Tirumurai. Appar, a contemporary of Sambandar, also praised the deity in ten verses in the Tevaram, compiled as the fifth Thirumurai. As the temple is revered in the Tevaram, it is classified as a Paadal Petra Sthalam, one of the 276 temples mentioned in the Tamil Saiva canon. Manikkavacakar, a 9th-century CE Tamil saint and poet, composed the Tiruvempavai at the temple, and described the deities as "Annamalai" and "Unnamulai". Arunagirinathar was a 15th-century CE Tamil poet born in Tiruvannamalai, who composed Tamil hymns glorifying Murugan, the most notable being Thiruppugazh.

Aathara Thalams are various Shiva temples considered to correspond to the Tantric chakras of the human body. The Arunachalesvara Temple corresponds to the Manipooraga chakra, associated with the solar plexus (naabhi moolam). The place is also called a Mukthi Thalam (place of salvation), and saints like Ramana Maharishi, Seshadri Swamigal, Gugai Namashivayar, Yogi Ramsuratkumar attained salvation within the temple.

== Architecture ==
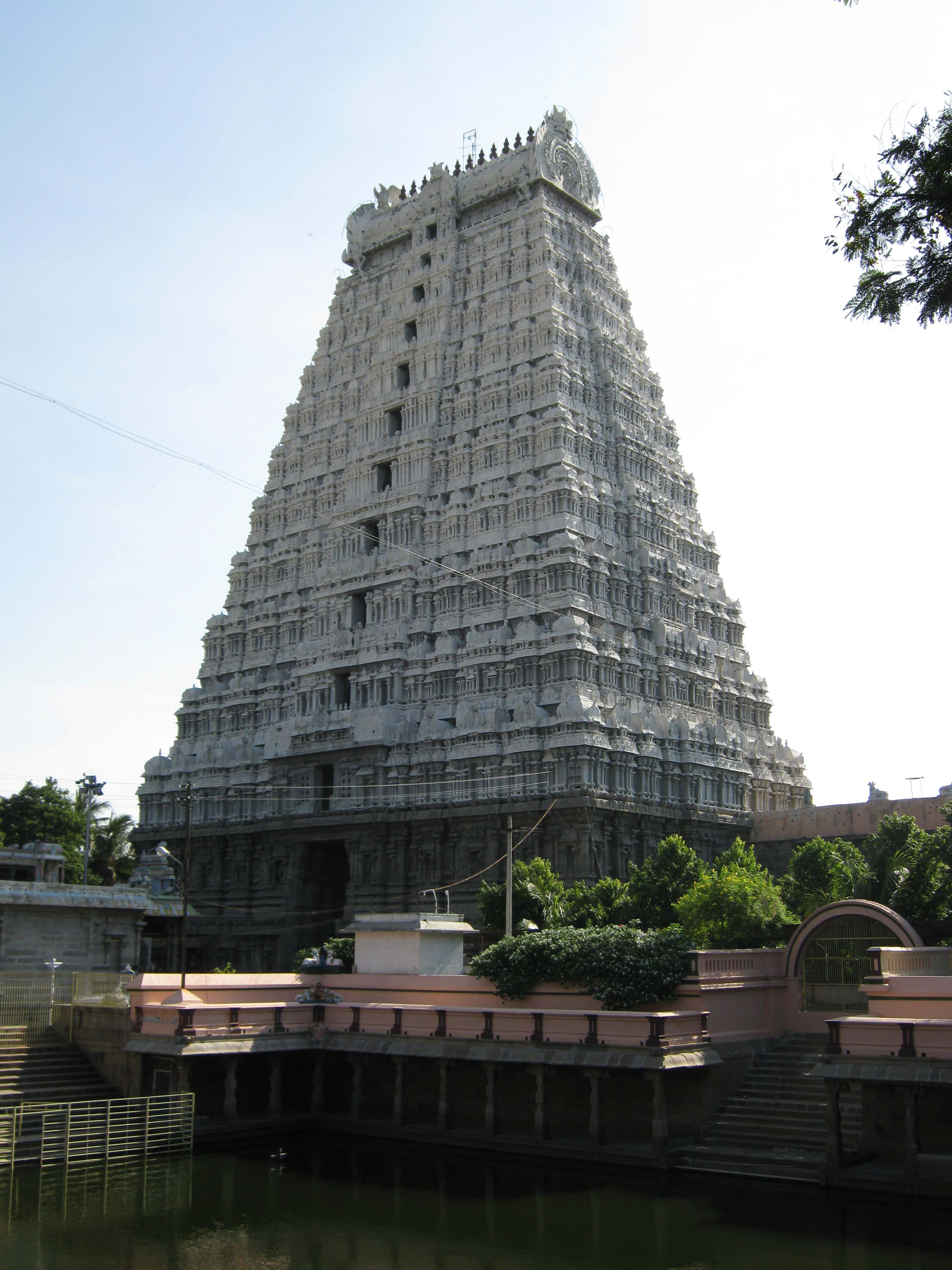
The Raja gopuram, the tallest tower

=== Complex and towers ===
The temple is situated at the foot of the Annamalai hills, spread over 25 acres (10 ha). The walls on the east and west measure 700 ft (210 m) in length, the south 1,479 ft (451 m), and the north 1,590 ft (480 m). It has gopurams (ornamental gateway towers), one on each side. The eastern tower, known as the Rajagopuram, is the tallest, and largest with a base measuring 135 ft (41 m) by 98 ft (30 m). The south tower is called Thirumanchangopuram, the west tower as Pe Gopuram, and the north tower as Ammani Amman gourami. The temple has five precincts, each of which holds a large Nandhi statue. Smaller towers include the Vallala maharaja and Kili gopurams. Brahma Nanneer, the temple tank, is located in the fourth precinct.

=== Shrines ===
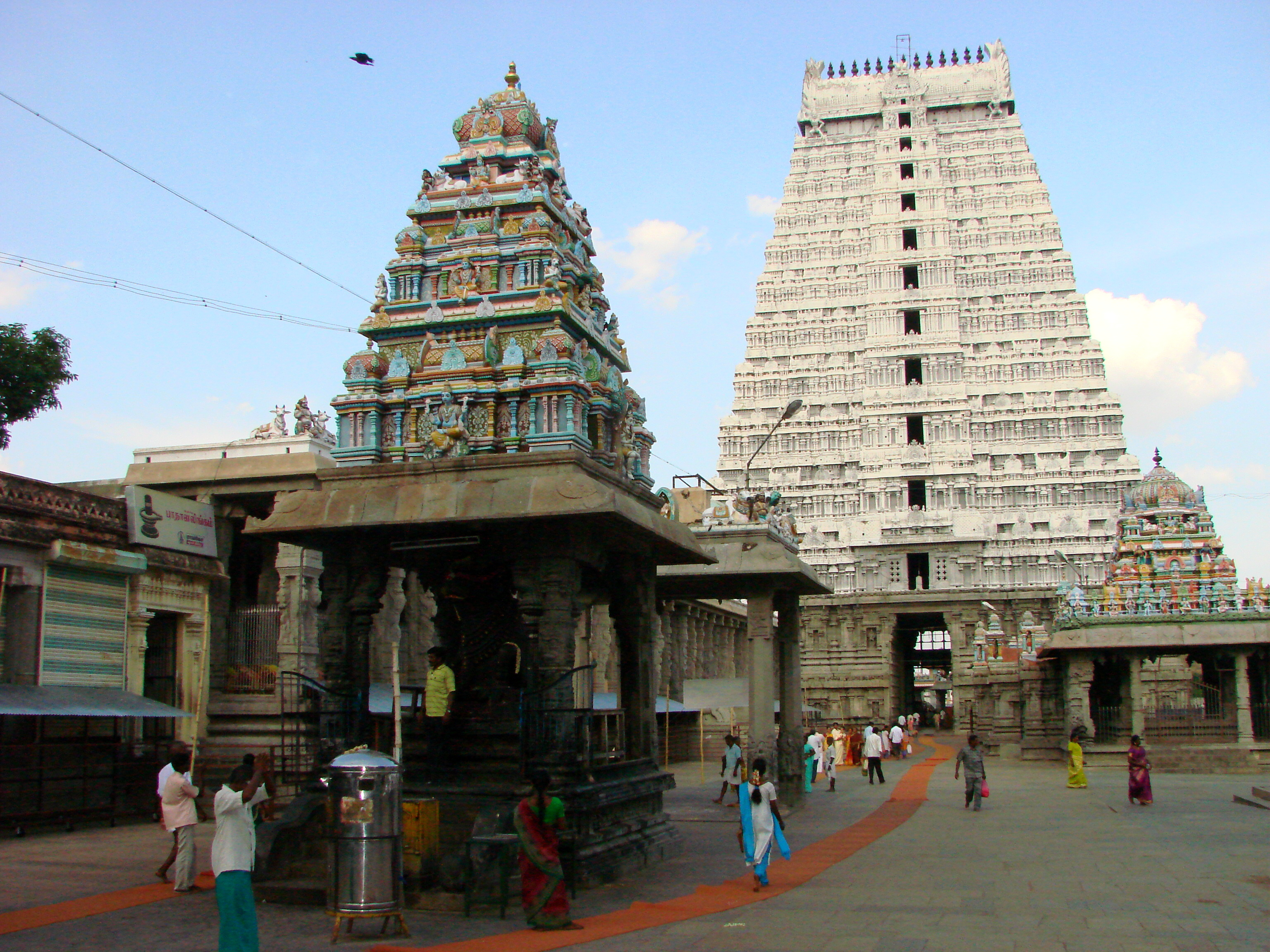
A shrine inside the temple complex

The main shrine, holding the lingam of Annamalaiyar, faces east. It is considered the oldest structures within the temple complex, and houses the images of Nandi, Shiva's vahana and Surya, the Sun god. On the backside of the sanctum walls, there is an image of Venugopalaswamy (a form of Krishna, an incarnation of Vishnu). Surrounding the sanctum are images of various Hindu deities, including Somakanthar, Durga, Chandeshvara, Gajalakshmi, Arumugaswami, and Dakshinamurti, Bhairava, Nataraja, and Lingodbhava. The palliyarai, the divine room for resting deities, is located at the first precinct around the sanctum.

The shrine of Shiva's consort, Unnamalai ammai, lies in the second precinct, with goddess depicted in a standing posture. Sambantha Pillaiyar's shrine is located to the north of the flagstaff, and Yanai Thirai Konda Pillaiyar shrine is located in the fourth precinct. To the south of the thousand-pillared hall, there is a small shrine for Subramanya and a large tank. There is a shrine of Sivagangai Pillaiyar along the northern bank of the Sivangangai tank. Pathala Lingam (underground lingam), located at the basement of the raised hall inside the temple complex, is the place where Ramana Maharshi performed his penance, and attained supreme awareness. A stone trident is present in the outer precinct of the temple in open air, and has protective railings. The temple tree, Magizha, is considered sacred and medicinal, and childless couples tie small cradles to its branches in obeisance.

=== Halls ===
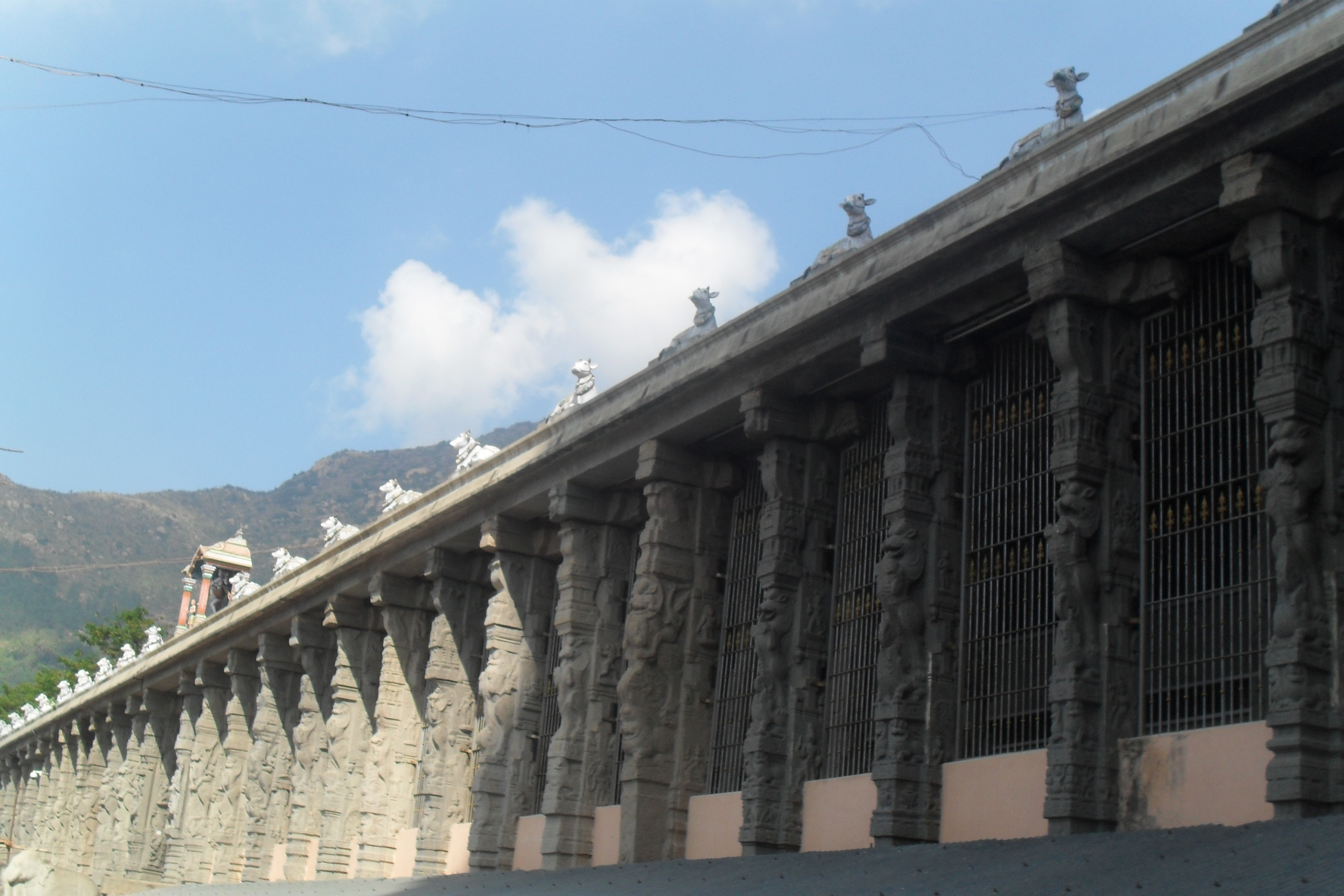
Thousand pillared hall inside the temple

There are various halls within the temple presmies. A sixteen pillared hall, known as Theepa Kaatchi Arangam (hall of light), in located in the third precinct. The Thirumana Mandapam (marriage hall), built in Vijayanagara style, is located in the south-west of the precinct. The Ilavenil Mandapam (hall of spring), located in the same precinct, consists of the Kalahateeswarar shrine and temple office. In the fourth precinct, there is a hall with a six-foot-tall statue of Nandhi, erected by Vallala.

In the fifth and outermost precinct, there is a thousand-pillared hall built during the late Vijayanagara period. The pillars in the hall are carved with images of yali, a mythological beast with body of lion and head of an elephant. The Arunagirinathar mndapam is located to the right of the Kalayana Linga Sundara Eswara mandapam, and the Gopurathilayanar shrine is to the left of a flight of stone stairs that lead up to the Vallala gopuram.

== Worship and festivals ==
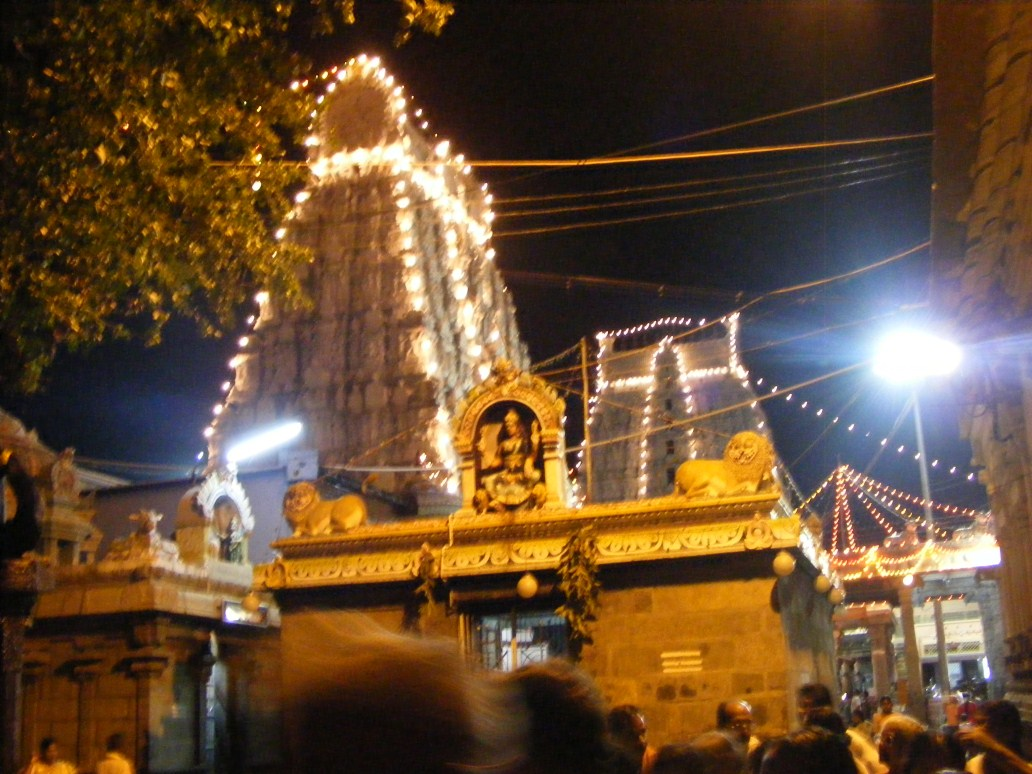
Temple lit during the Karthika Deepam

The temple priests perform pujas (rituals) six times on a daily basis. These include the Kaalaippani at 5:30 a.m., Kaalai Vazhipaadu at 8:00 a.m., Nadunchama Vazhipaadu at 10:00 a.m., Maalaipani at 6:00 p.m., Irandaam Kaalai Pani at 8:00 p.m. and Iravuppani at 10:00 p.m. Each ritual comprises four steps: Thirumanchanam (sacred bath), Alangaaram (decoration), Neivedhiyam (food offering) and Theepaarathanai (waving of lamps) for both Annamalaiyar and Unnamulai Amman. The worship is held amidst music with nagaswaram (pipe instrument) and tavil (percussion instrument), religious instructions in the Vedas read by priests and prostration by worshippers in front of the temple mast. Special pujas are performed on Mondays (Soma varam) and Fridays (Sukra varam), and on Pradosha, Amavasya, Purnima, Chaturthi, and Kiruthigai.

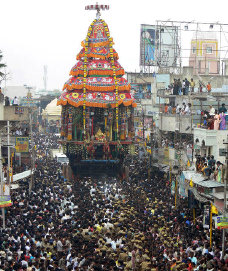
Temple car procession

The temple celebrates various Hindu festivals throughout the year. Four prime festivals, the Thiruvizha, are celebrated yearly. The most important of these lasts ten days during the Tamil month of Karthigai (November–December), concluding with the celebration of Karthika Deepam. During the Deepam festival, A lamp is lit in a huge cauldron, containing tons of Nei (Ghee), at the top of the Annamalai hill. On the occasion, the image of Annamalaiyar is taken on a wooden chariot around the mountain. Inscriptions indicate that the festival was celebrated as early as the Chola period (from 850 CE to 1280 CE) and was expanded to ten days in the 20th century.

Every full moon, thousands of pilgrims circumambulate the Annamalai hill barefoot. The circumambulation covers a distance of 14 km (8.7 mi), and is referred as girivalam. According to Hindu legend, the circumambulation is considered as an atonement for one's sins, fulfils wishes and helps achieve freedom from the cycle of birth and rebirth. Various offerings are made in the temple tanks, shrines, pillared halls, springs and caves around the hill. On Chitra Pournami, five wooden temple cars are used for taking the gods on a procession.

Thiruvoodal is celebrated during the first week of the Tamil month Thai every year. On the morning of Maatu Pongal, the Nandi is decorated with garlands made of fruits, vegetables and sweets. The deities of Annamalaiyar and Unnamulai Amman are taken out of the temple to Thiruvoodal Street to enact the oodal (or love tiff) between the two in the evening.
