= List of Hindu festivals =

Explanatory note on Hindu festival dates
- The Hindu calendar is lunisolar but most festival dates are specified using the lunar portion of the calendar. A lunar day is uniquely identified by three calendar elements: māsa (lunar month), pakṣa (lunar fortnight) and tithi (lunar day). Furthermore, when specifying the masa, one of two traditions are applicable, viz. amānta / pūrṇimānta. If a festival falls in the waning phase of the moon, these two traditions identify the same lunar day as falling in two different (but successive) masa. A lunar year is shorter than a solar year by about eleven days. As a result, most Hindu festivals occur on different days in successive years on the Gregorian calendar.

Hindus observe a wide range of festivals and religious celebrations, many of which are rooted in ancient Indian traditions, and often correspond with seasonal transitions. These festivals are scheduled according to either the solar calendar or the lunisolar calendar, and their observance often varies regionally. Many festivals are specific to certain sects or are primarily observed in particular regions of the Indian subcontinent.

== Terminology ==
=== Utsava ===
Utsava is the Sanskrit word for festivals. It comes from the word ut meaning "starts" and sava, which means "change" or "decline".

=== Observance periods (tithi) ===
Hindu calendar dates are usually in accordance with a lunisolar calendar. In Vedic timekeeping, a māsa is a lunar month, a pakṣa is a lunar fortnight (two weeks), and a tithi is a lunar day.

There are two prevailing definitions of the lunar month: amānta, where the month ends with the new moon, and pūrṇimānta, where it ends with the full moon. Consequently, the same day may be associated with different but adjoining months. When a festival takes place during śukla paksha (the waxing phase of the moon), both traditions attribute it to the same month. However, if the festival occurs during kṛiṣhṇa paksha (the waning phase of the moon), the two traditions assign it to different, but adjacent months.

Major Hindu festivals
Festival	māsa		pakṣa	tithi
Festival	amānta	pūrṇimānta	pakṣa	tithi
Gudi Padwa/Ugadi	caitra		śukla	prathama
Rama Navami	caitra		śukla	navamī
Akshaya Tritiya				
Guru Purnima	āṣādha		śukla	pūrima
Naga Panchami				
Raksha Bandhan	śrāvaṇa		śukla	pūrima
Krishna Janmashtami	śrāvaṇa	bhādra	kṛṣṇa	aṣṭamī
Ganesh Chaturthi	bhādra		śukla	caturthī
Ganesh Visarjan	bhādra		śukla	pūrima
Pitru Paksha begins	bhādra	āśvina	kṛṣṇa	prathama
Pitru Paksha ends Sarvapitru Amavasya	bhādra	āśvina	kṛṣṇa	amāvasyā
Navaratri begins	āśvina		śukla	prathama
Durga Ashtami (8th day of Navaratri)	āśvina		śukla	aṣṭamī
Maha Navami (9th day of Navaratri)	āśvina		śukla	navamī
Navaratri ends Vijaya Dashami	āśvina		śukla	daśamī
Karva Chauth	āśvina	kārtika	kṛṣṇa	caturthī
Diwali begins Dhan Teras	āśvina	kārtika	kṛṣṇa	trayodaśī
Naraka Chaturdashi (2nd day of Diwali)	āśvina	kārtika	kṛṣṇa	caturdaśī
Deepavali / Lakshmi Puja (3rd day of Diwali)	āśvina	kārtika	kṛṣṇa	amāvasyā
Annakut or Bali Padyami (4th day of Diwali)	kārtika		śukla	prathama
Diwali ends Bhai Dooj	kārtika		śukla	dvitīya
Vasant Panchami	magha		śukla	pañcamī
Maha Shivaratri	magha	phālguna	kṛṣṇa	caturdaśī
Holi	phālguna		śukla	caturdaśī

== List and descriptions of the major Hindu festivals ==
The tithi shown in the following list is as per the amānta tradition.

Major Hindu festivals	Photo	Hindu tithi of observance	Descriptions
Bhogi (also known as Lohri in Punjab and Laal Loi in parts of North India)	Bhogi bonfire in Andhra Pradesh	Bhogi marks the first day of the 4-day Sankrathi festivities and occurs one day before Makara Sankranthi, marking the transition of the Sun into Makara rasi.	Bhogi is a festival celebrated in Tamil Nadu, Karnataka, Andhra Pradesh, and Telangana. Bhogi is a festival that symbolises renewal and transformation, during which people discard old, unused, or derelict items to make way for new beginnings.
Makar Sankranti or Pongal or Uttarayana or Maghe Sankranti or Maghi or Magh Bihu	Colorful floor artwork (muggulu) decorate entrances and streets on Makar Sankranti in Andhra Pradesh	Makara Sankranti or Pongal marks the transition of the Sun into Makara rasi. It marks the gradual increase of the duration of the day. Pongal is the first day of Uttarayana and coincides with the beginning of the Tamil month of Thai.	Pongal is a harvest festival in Tamil Nadu. Pongal occurs annually on January 14 (on the Gregorian calendar) and marks the beginning of Uttarayana (the sun's journey northward). The Pongal festival lasts for four days. Celebrations include the drawing of Kolam, swinging, Jallikattu, and the cooking of Pongal.
Vasant Panchami	Goddess Saraswati on Vasant Panchami, Kolkata, sitting on a swing and holding a Veena	Fifth day of the waxing moon of Magh (Hindu calendar)	Vasant Panchami (also called Saraswati Puja by Bengalis and Odias) is celebrated for the blessing of Goddess Saraswati, Hindu goddess of wisdom and the arts.
Thaipusam or Kavadi	Murugan during Thaipusam	The full moon day of the Tamil month of Thai.	Thaipusam is a Hindu festival predominantly celebrated by the Tamils. The name Thaipusam is derived from the Tamil month Thai and Pushya, the name of a group of stars within the Cancer constellation. The festival marks the occasion when Parvati presented Murugan, the Tamil God of War, with a spear to defeat the demon Soorapadman. Kavadi Attam (Tamil:காவடி ஆட்டம்), a dance performed by the devotees during the ceremonial worship of Murugan, emphasises debt bondage. The Kavadi itself is a physical burden through which the devotees implore for help Murugan.
Maha Shivaratri	Statue of Shiva meditating	Thirteenth night of the waning moon of Magh (amanta) / Phalguna (purnimanta)	Maha Shivaratri ("The Night of Shiva") is a Hindu festival dedicated to Shiva. It falls on the fourteenth night of the new moon in Phalgun (February – March). Shivaratri falls on the fourteenth night of the new moon in Phalgun (February – March). During the festival of Shivaratri, devotees observe a day-and-night fast and perform ritual worship of the Shiva Lingam, including ceremonial bathing with offerings such as milk, yogurt, honey, ghee, sugar, and water. Some devotees also perform ritual baths in sacred rivers such as the Ganges. Temples often hold night vigils (jagran), during which hymns and devotional songs are recited, and the fast is broken the following morning with prasad offered to the deity.
Holi	Holi in Pushkar, Rajasthan	Full moon of the Phalgun month (Hindu calendar)	Holi or Phagwah is a spring festival. Holi commemorates the slaying of the demoness Holika by Lord Vishnu's devotee Prahlad. Thus, the festival's name is derived from the Sanskrit words Holika Dahanam, which literally means "Holika's slaying". The festival is called Shigmo and Shimga in Goa and rural Maharashtra, respectively. In Odisha and West Bengal, it is also celebrated as Dol Purnima.
Shigmo	Young man at the Shimgo holding aarat	5 days before full moon of Phalgun until the full moon of Phalgun	Shigmo is celebrated in Goa as one of the major festivals of the Konkani Hindu community. The main festival coincides with Holi.
Rang Panchami	Rang Panchami - Baburao Painter		In Maharashtra and parts of Madhya Pradesh, the festival of colours is celebrated five days after Holi on Rang Panchami.
Gangaur	Mother Gaur		Gangaur is a festival important to Rajasthanis, celebrated throughout the state by women who worship Gauri, the consort of Shiva, during the Hindu month of Chaitra (March–April). It is the celebration of spring, harvest, marital fidelity, conjugal blessedness, and childbearing. Unmarried women worship the goddess in hopes of being blessed with a good husband, while married women do so for the welfare, health, and long life of their husbands.
Vasant Navratri	Shardiya Navratri Festival in Pune 2020	First nine days of the Chaitra month (Hindu calendar)	Navratri is the Hindu festival of worship and dance. In Sanskrit, the term literally means "nine nights". During these nine days of the festival, devotees honor the forms of Shakti, or divine feminine energy, and observe fasting as an expression of devotion. Over the nine days, nine incarnations of Shakti (Maa Durga) are worshipped.
Rama Navami or Shri Rama Navami	Home shrine on Rama Navami	Ninth of the Chaitra month (Hindu calendar)	Rama Navami or Shri Rama Navami is the celebration of the birth of Rama. Ram Navami falls on the ninth day of the bright fortnight in the month of Chaitra (March/April). In some regions, the festival is observed over nine days. This day is also celebrated as the wedding anniversary of Lord Rama and Sita, known as Kalyanotsavam.
Gudi Padwa, Cheti Chand, Yugadi, Navreh (Chandramana Nava Varsha), Ugadi	Traditional Gudhi	First Day of waxing moon of Chaitra (Hindu calendar)	Gudhi Padwa / Cheti Chand is celebrated on the first day of the Hindu Lunar month of Chaitra, and is celebrated as New Year's Day by Marathis, Konkanis and Sindhis. According to the Brahma Purana, this is the day on which Brahma created the world. Ugadi (meaning "the start of an era" in Telugu and Kannada) is New Year's Day for the Telugus and Kannadigas.
Mesha Sankranti or Baisakhi	Ganges at Haridwar, Uttarakhand	First day of solar month of Vaisakha.	Mesha Sankranti (also called Vaisakha Sankranti) represents the transition of the sun into the Mesha (Aries) Zodiac and marks the start of the solar new year in lunisolar calendars. Regional new year festivals are also observed on this day such as Vishu, Pohela Boishakh, Maha Vishubha Sankranti and Vaisakhi.
Vishu	Traditional vishu kani		Vishu is a Hindu festival celebrated in Kerala. It falls around 14 April of the Gregorian calendar. "Vishu" means equal in Sanskrit. Vishu is a symbol of the beginning of spring season. Vishu is a festival for the family.
Puthandu (Tamil New Year)			The Tamil New Year follows the Nirayana vernal equinox. It falls around 14 April of the Gregorian calendar.
Rongali Bihu	Bihu dancer with 'pepa'	Vaisakha/Bohag (Assamese Calendar) – The first month of Hindu calendar	Rongali Bihu (mid-April, also called Bohag Bihu), is a traditional ethnic festival that celebrates the onset of the Assamese New Year (around 14 April) and the coming of Spring.
Hanuman Jayanti	Shri Hanuman Mandir		Hanuman Jayanti is the celebration of the birth of Hanuman, Rama's loyal devotee. Hanuman is known for his great strength, power and his immortal devotion towards Lord Rama. He is considered to be one of the most powerful Hindu gods in India. On the auspicious day of Hanuman Jayanti, people apply red sindoor from Lord's feet on their foreheads. This is considered a ritual for good health and good luck.
Sitalsasthi		Sixth day of the bright fortnight of the month of Jyestha (Hindu calendar)	In Odisha, the marriage of Shiva and Parvati is celebrated as Sitalsasthi. It is celebrated as a carnival, and begins with the ceremonial marriage of the two deities.
Vat Savitri or Vat Amavasya	Tying threads around a banyan tree (wata)	Full moon of Jyeshta (Hindu calendar)	Vat Pournima is observed in Maharashtra. Pournima means "full moon." Women pray for the prosperity of their husbands by tying threads around a banyan tree.
Bonalu	Women with Bonam performing parikrama		Bonalu is an annual festival centered on the Goddess Mahakali from Telangana. It is celebrated in both Hyderabad and Secunderabad between the months of July and August. This festival is dated back to 1813 in Hyderabad and Secunderabad.
Bathukamma	Women dancing around Bathukammas		Bathukamma is a festival celebrated during the months of September and October in the ten districts of Telangana. Celebrated for nine days, it is characterised by exotic flowers from the region.
Rath Yatra	Rath Jatra in Puri	Second to tenth day of waxing moon phase of month Ashadha (Hindu Calendar)	Ratha Yatra is a procession where the wooden idol of Jagannath, Subhadra and Balbhadra is taken through the streets in a chariot.
Raja Parba	Raja Doli khela, Oriya festival	The second day (Raja Shankranti) signifies the beginning of the solar month of Mithuna.	Raja Parba is a four-day-long festival. It inaugurates and welcomes the agricultural year all over Odisha.
Guru Purnima	Sanyasi performing Vyasa puja	Full moon of Ashadh (Hindu calendar)	Guru Purnima is the day devotees offer puja (worship) to their Guru. This was also the day when Vyasa, author of the Mahabharata, was born.
Mahalakshmi Vrata or Varalakshmi Vratham	Mahalakshmi	'Vara MahaLakshmi Vrata' is celebrated on the Second Friday or the Friday before the day of the full moon – Poornima – in the month of Shravana, which corresponds to the Gregorian months of July–August.	Varalakshmi Vratham or Mahalakshmi Vrata is a puja performed by married Hindu women to seek the blessings of Mahalakshmi, goddess of wealth and prosperity. It is celebrated as Varalakshmi Vratham in South Indian states. It is performed by married women (sumangalis) for the well-being of all their family members, especially the husband and to seek progeny among other things. It is believed that worshipping the Goddess Varalakshmi on this day is equivalent to worshipping Ashtalakshmi – the eight goddesses of Wealth, Earth, Wisdom, Love, Fame, Peace, Contentment, and Strength.
Onam	Thiruvathira Kali during Onam in Kerala		Onam is the harvest festival of Kerala. Though it is traditionally observed in Kerala, contemporarily it is celebrated by the Kerala diaspora across the globe. Onam honours Bhagwan Vamana, the fifth avatar of Bhagwan Vishnu, and marks the birthday of Bhagwan Vamana and annual visit of his benevolent devotee Bali (the grandson of Bhakta Prahlada). It falls during the month of Chingam (August–September) and lasts ten days. The festival is marked by various festivities, including intricate flower carpets, Onam Sadya (elaborate banquet lunches), snake boat races, Onappottan, Kaazhchakkula in Guruvayoor, Puli Kali, Kaikottikkali etc.
Raksha Bandhan or Rakhi Purnima	Rakhis	Full moon of Shravana (Hindu calendar)	Rakhi Purnima or Raksha Bandhan is a festival celebrated mainly in northern Indian states. Rakhi is a special occasion to celebrate the chaste bond of love between a brother and a sister.
Teejdi or Kajri Teej		Third day after Raksha Bandhan	Teejdi is a festival celebrated by Sindhis. On this day, Sindhi women observe a day-long fast for the long life of their husbands. They break their fast after "Chandra Darshan" i.e. seeing the Moon.
Shitla Satam		Seventh Day after Raksha Bandhan	Shitla Satam is celebrated on the day after Raksha Bandhan. On this day, mothers fast for their children and eat food that is not warm. Women observing this fast keep the stove/gas turned off for the entire day. This day is generally observed by Gujarati families.
Krishna Janmaashtami or Krishnashtami	ISKCON temple in Delhi at Janamashtami	Eighth day of waning moon of Shravana (amanta) / Bhadrapad (purnimanta)	Krishnashtami, Krishna Janmaashtami, or Krishna Jayanthi, is the Hindu festival celebrating the birth of Krishna. It is observed in India in July or August, on the Ashtami (eighth day) of the Krishna Paksh (waning moon) in the month of Bhadrapad coinciding with Rohini Nakshatra. It is celebrated at midnight when Krishna is believed to be born on a dark, stormy and windy night to end the rule and violence of his uncle, Kamsa. All over India, this day is celebrated with devotional songs and dances, pujas, arti, blowing of the Conch and rocking the cradle of baby Krishna. In Mathura and Vrindavan, the places where Krishna had spent his life, temples and homes are decorated and illuminated. Night long prayers are offered and religious mantras are sung in the temples.
Radhashtami	Radhashtami celebration at Iskcon Vrindavan	Eighth day of waxing moon of Bhadrapada (Hindu calendar)	Radhashtami is celebrated all across India, especially in Northern India, on the eighth day of Bhadrapad, as the birth anniversary of Goddess Radha, consort of Lord Krishna.
Gowri Habba or Hartalika Teej			Gowri Habba is celebrated in Karnataka, Andhra Pradesh, and Tamil Nadu. Gowri is worshipped for her ability to bestow courage to her devotees. Newly wed couples are invited to the house of the groom's parents and served with varieties of food.
Ganesh Chaturthi or Vinayaka Chavithi	Ganesh Visarjan in Mumbai	Fourth day of the waxing moon of Bhadrapada (Hindu calendar)	Vinayaka Chavithi or Ganesh Chaturthi is celebrated as the arrival of Ganesh on Earth, celebrated in Maharashtra, especially in Pune.
Nuakhai		Fifth day of the waxing moon of Bhadrapada (Hindu calendar)	Nuakhai is celebrated to welcome the new rice of the season. This is an agricultural festival mainly observed by people of western Odisha (Kosal).
Navaratri	Garba dance in Ahmedabad	First nine nights of the waxing moon of Ashvin	Navaratri is centered around the worship of the Divine Feminine. In Sanskrit, the term literally means "nine nights". During this festival, the forms of Shakti are worshipped. This nine-day period from the new moon day to the ninth day of Ashvin is considered the most auspicious time of the Hindu calendar and is hence the most celebrated time of the year. Although it has different names in different parts of India, Hindus from all regions celebrate it as the conquest of good over evil. Every region has its own myths and reasons to explain this.
Durga Puja	Durga Puja celebration in Dhaka	First ten nights of the waxing moon of Ashvin	Durga Puja is a celebration of the goddess Durga's triumph over Mahishasura. These are the most popular forms under which she is worshipped: Durga, goddess beyond reach; Kali, the auspicious power of time; Amba or Jagdamba, mother of the world; Annapurna, giver of food and plenty; Sarvamangala, auspicious goddess; Bhairavi, terrible, fearful, power of death; Chandika or Chandi, violent, wrathful, furious; Lalita, playful; Bhavani, giver of existence; Tara, giver of success in work. It is the most important festival of Bengalis, Nepalis and Odias.
Vijayadashami		Tenth day of waxing moon of Ashvin (Hindu calendar)	Vijayadashami is the Hindu celebration of good over evil.
Govatsa Dwadashi or Dhanteras	In a poster condemning the consumption of beef, the sacred cow Kamadhenu is depicted as containing various deities within her body.	Twelfth day of the waning moon fortnight (Krishna Paksha) in the month of Kartik (Hindu calendar)	Govatsa Dwadashi is the worship of cows as chief source of livelihood and religious sanctity; being the first day of Diwali celebrations. Sripada Vallabha Aradhana Utsav of Sripada Sri Vallabha, at Pithapuram Datta Mahasamsthan in the state of Andhra Pradesh. Dhanteras - Dhanteras (Hindi: धनतेरस), also known as Dhanatrayodashi (Sanskrit: धनत्रयोदशी), is the first day that marks the festival of Diwali in India. It is celebrated on the thirteenth lunar day of Krishna Paksha (dark fortnight) in the Hindi calendar month of Ashvin. Dhanvantari, who is also worshipped on the occasion of Dhanteras, is considered the God of Ayurveda who imparted the wisdom of Ayurveda for the betterment of mankind, and to help rid it of the suffering of disease.
Diwali or Deepavali	Rangoli decorations	New moon of Ashvin (amanta) / Kartika (purnimanta)	Deepavali which means "row of lights/lamps" in Kannada and Telugu and Marathi and Sanskrit is called "Diwali" in North India, Deepa means lamp and in Hindi a lamp is mostly called a Diya or Di. The festival is celebrated on the occasion of Lord Krishna and his wife Satyabhama killing a demon Narakasura. Another story says the festival is celebrated for the return of Rama and Sita to the kingdom Ayodhya after fourteen years of exile. Rama is exiled to the forest for 14 years, his devoted wife Sita and humble brother Laxman decide to join him, after 14 years the whole village know he is returning so light lamps or 'divas' to guide him, his wife and brother home. So every year lamps are lit to represent Rama finding his way back home after the harsh punishment of being sent to exile in the forest.
Bhai dooj(Bhratri Dvitiya)		Second day of the waxing moon of Kartik (Hindu calendar)	Bhai dooj, also referred to as Bhaubeej in Marathi or Bhaiphonta in Bengali, is the ceremony performed by Hindus, generally, on the second day of Deepavali. It is celebrated among brothers and sisters and is similar to Raksha Bandhan, except there is no tying of rakhi involved.
Karva Chauth (Kark Chaturthi) or Atla Tadde	Women observing Karva Chauth	Four days after purnima (a full moon) in the month of Ashvin (amanta) Kartika (purnimanta). Like many Hindu festivals, Karva Chauth is based on the lunisolar calendar which accounts for all astronomical positions, especially positions of the moon which is used as a marker to calculate important dates. The festival falls on the fourth day after the full moon, in the Hindu lunisolar calendar month of Kartik	Karva Chauth is a one-day festival celebrated by Hindu women from some regions of India, especially northern India. On Karva Chauth, the married women, especially in Northern India, fast from sunrise to moonrise for the safety and longevity of their husbands. The Karva Chauth fast is traditionally celebrated in the states of Delhi, Haryana, Rajasthan, Punjab, Jammu, Uttar Pradesh, Himachal Pradesh and Madhya Pradesh. It is known as Atla Tadde in Andhra Pradesh.
Kartika Purnima		15th of the Full moon day of Kartik (November–December)	A unique festival is celebrated in Varanasi this day which is called Dev Deepavali. The Kartik Purnima festival also coincides with the Jain light festival and Guru Nanak Jayanti
Chhath	Morning worship at Jamshedpur		Chhath is mainly observed in Bihar and Terai, but is also celebrated elsewhere. It is a festival dedicated to the Sun God for bestowing the bounties of life and fulfilling wishes. During Chath, devotees worship God Surya early in the morning.
Skanda Sashti			Skanda Sashti is decided on lunar month during the sixth day of Karthika Masam (October–November). It is one of the most important festival dedicated to Lord Murugan the second son of Shiva. On this festival is celebrated the victory of Murugan against the Asuras.
Champa Sashti			Champa Sashti festival is a six-day festival observed from the first to the sixth of the Hindu month of Margashirsha (November – early December). It is one of the most important festivals dedicated to Lord Khandoba. This festival celebrates the victory of Khandoba against the demons Mani-Malla.
Prathamastami		After 8 days of Kartik Purnima	Prathamastami is a festival that originated in Odia. It is held on the eighth day of the month of Agrahayana, when older female relatives pray for the prosperity of their eldest child. The festival is followed by rituals and recitations of the Glory of Mahalakshmi and Shashti Devi.
Yatra	Dnyaneshwar's palkhi holding the footwear of the saint		Yatra (also Zatra and jatra) refers to the pilgrimage festivals celebrated at Hindu temples. Idols and murtis are taken out on special procession in a palkhi (a palanquin) or a chariot called the rath. Every temple observes this festival once a year on the traditional day. Palkhi is main tradition of Maharashtra. Sant Dhnyaneshwar had started the palkhi from Alandi (Pune) to Pandharpur. Every year Marathi people celebrates Palkhi from Alandi and Dehu to Pandharpur.
Karthikai Deepam or Kartika Deepam	Pithalai vilakku during Karthigai Deepam in Mumbai.		Kartika Deepam or Karthikai Deepam is an ancient festival of lights celebrated by Tamil Hindus and Telugu Hindus on the full moon day of the Karthikai/Kartika month (November/December). This occurs on the day when the moon is in conjunction with the constellation Karthigai (Pleiades) and purnima. It is the same as Kartik Poornima; however, since Tamils follow the Hindu Solar calendar with correction for precession of the equinoxes, the Tamil date matches the actual constellation.
Vaikasi Visakam		Birth star of Kartikeya	Vaikasi Vishaka is an ancient Hindu festival celebrated on Vishākhā star on Vaisakha month by South Indians and Sri Lankans especially followers of Kaumaram and Shaiva Siddhanta.
Pancha Ganapati		A winter solstice celebration that lasts five days.	Pancha Ganapati is a modern Hindu festival celebrating Lord Ganesha, the Five-Faced Maha Ganapati—Lord of Categories.
Kumbh Mela	Procession of Akharas marching over the Ganges.	A pilgrimage made to the Ganges, Yamuna and Saraswati river	The Purna (complete) Kumbh takes place every twelve years, and is an ordinary large Kumbh Mela. The Ardh (half) Kumbh Mella, a smaller Kumbh Mela, is celebrated every six years. The normal Kumbh Mela is celebrated every 3 years. The Maha (great) Kumbh Mela, a special large Kumbh Mela, occurs every 12 'Purna Kumbh Melas', or 144 years.
Shravani Mela	Devotees at Shravani Mela in Deoghar	A month-long Hindu festival observed in the month of Shravan (July–August) at the Baba Baidyanath Dham temple in Deoghar, Jharkhand, India.	Shravani Mela is one of the largest religious gatherings in India, attracting millions of devotees, primarily the Kanwariyas, who undertake a pilgrimage to offer holy water from the Ganges to Lord Shiva.
Godavari Pushkaram or Purna Kumbha Mela	Stage of Godavari Aarathi in Rajamundry		Godavari Pushkaram or Godavari Pushkaralu is most commonly stated as it is the festival of the river Godavari. The main significance of this Godavari Pushkaralu is that it occurs once in every 12 years in other words called as Pushakaram. The river Godavari took it birth at triambakeswar in Nasik which is located in Maharashtra state. It flow along the various regions of Andhra Pradesh, Telangana, Maharashtra and Karnataka and finally flows into the Bay of Bengal. Maha Pushkaralu which comes once in 144 years. Main centre's that celebrate Pushkaram are Rajahmundry, Bhadrachalam, Trimbakeshwar & Nashik. Most of the Godavari River is connected with Rajahmundry, where it has wide spread across the city.
Sama Chakeva			Sama Chakeva (Nepali or Hindi: सामाचकेवा) is an important festival observed by the Mithila region that extends from Terai of Nepal to Bihar and Jharkhand states of India. With great enthusiasm, young brothers and sisters celebrate this festival in Kartik as per the Bikram Sambat Calendar, typically in November. This period traditionally marks the migration of beautiful and colourful birds from the Himalayas to plains of Nepal (Terai) and India. This festival demonstrates love and affection between brothers and sisters. This festival begins immediately after the conclusion of Chhath festival in Nepal and northern parts of India, and it ends on the full moon day of Kartik, which coincides in the month of November.
Tulsi Pujan Diwas		25 December every year	Tulsi Pujan Diwas is celebrated on 25 December by Hindus in India. Tulsi in Hinduism is used for medicinal and spiritual use. It is considered sacred in Hinduism and it is believed that Tulsi brings prosperity.
Naga Panchami	Nagabana at Belle Badagumane, Moodubelle, Udupi	Fifth day of Shravan month of the Lunar calendar	Naga Panchami is a traditional worship of snakes or serpents observed by Hindus throughout India, Nepal and other countries where Hindu adherents live.

== Sublists ==
- List of Hindu festivals in Punjab
- List of festivals observed at Jagannatha Temple, Puri
- List of Sindhi festivals

== See also ==
Hindu festival-related concepts

- Astronomical basis of the Hindu calendar
- Coconut: use for worship
- Culture of India
- Dhupa
- Hindu prayer beads
- Hindu temple
- Incense of India
- Mala
- Ghats
- Mudras
- Namaste
- Pādodaka
- Pranāma
- Parikrama
- The Archaeology of Hindu Ritual
- Yatra
- Paryaya

Others

- Buddhist prayer beads
- Guru-shishya tradition
- Jain festivals
- Lists of festivals
- Puja (Buddhism)
- List of Hindu Empires and Dynasties
