= Rakher Upobash =

Annual Bengali Hindu religious festival in Bangladesh

Rakher Upobash (Bengali: রাখের উপবাস) is an annual Bengali Hindu observance in Bangladesh. The ritual combines day-long fasting with evening prayers and the lighting of rows of small earthen oil lamps. The practice is especially prominent at the Shri Shri Lokenath Brahmachari Ashram in Barodi, Narayanganj, where large gatherings form during the Kartik evenings.

== History ==
The observance developed around devotional practices connected to the 18th-century saint Lokenath Brahmachari, whose followers emphasised prayer, self-restraint and acts of light-offering during the month of Kartik. Over time, Barodi became a focal point for these activities as devotees gathered at the ashram associated with the saint's teachings.

Local communities also adapted lamp-lighting customs traditionally observed in Kartik, and by the mid-20th century the ceremony had become a regular annual event in various districts. Reports and photographs published in Bangladeshi media in later decades show that crowds, lamp patterns and fasting practices had become established features of Rakher Upobash across several regions.

== Observance ==
The event is observed every year on Saturdays and Tuesdays during the last fifteen days of the Bengali month of Kartik. Participants typically fast from the morning until dusk, observing the fast as an act of discipline and as a vow for health, protection or the well-being of family members.

== Rituals ==
At sunset, devotees gather in courtyards or temple grounds to light hundreds of small oil lamps placed in orderly rows. Incense is burned, and participants sit together facing the lamps while chanting or meditating. In many regions the observance is linked with reverence for Lokenath Brahmachari, and his followers maintain an especially strong presence at Barodi.

== Cultural significance ==
Though religious in nature, Rakher Upobash has become notable for its visual and communal character. Large public gatherings, illuminated courtyards and the thick incense-filled atmosphere are widely photographed and reported in Bangladeshi media, contributing to its recognition as a distinctive cultural practice.

== See also ==
- Karthika Deepam
- Vrat
- Kartik
