= Karthika Deepam =

Hindu festival of lights

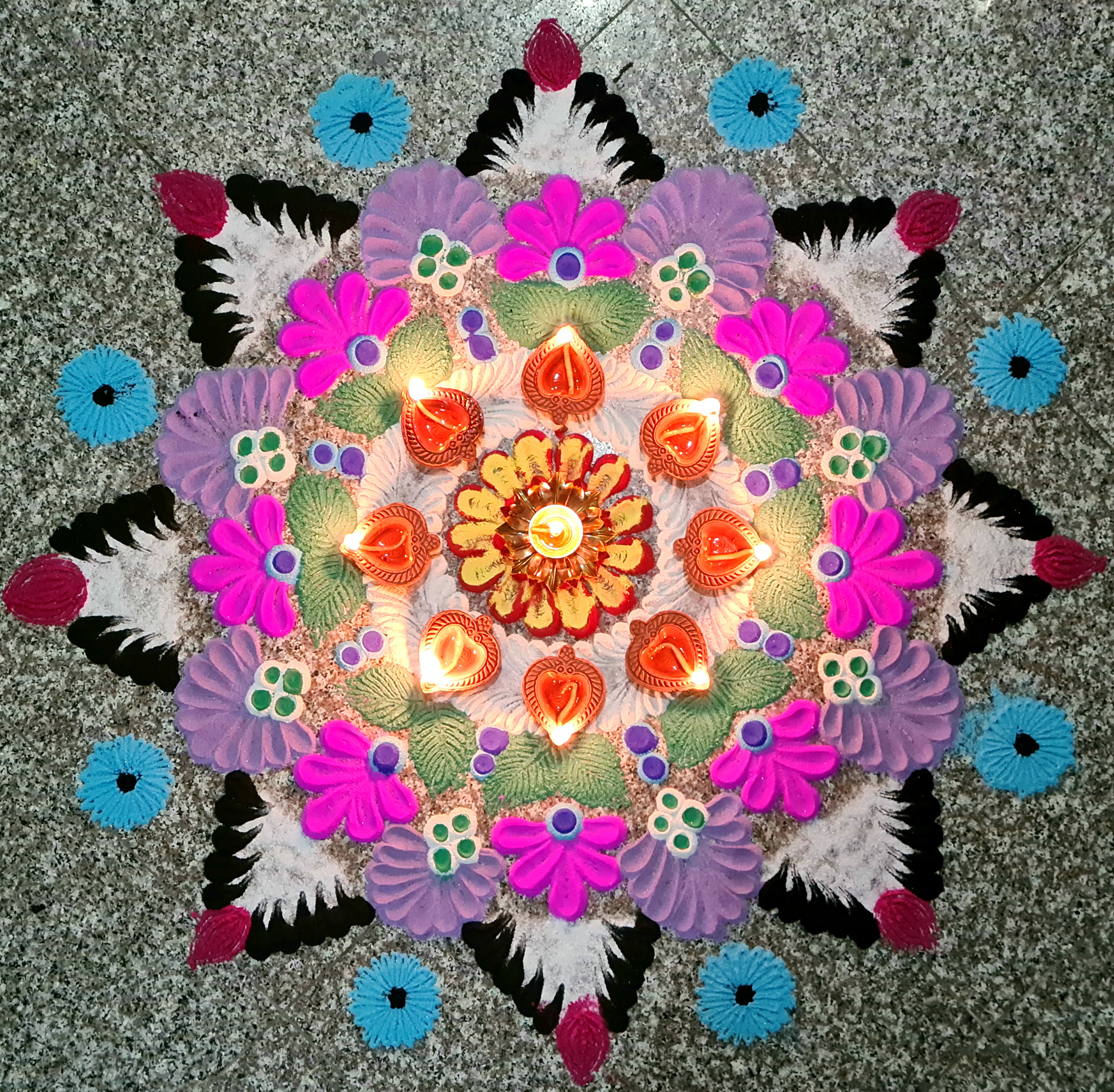
- Oil lamps arranged on a kolam during Karthika Deepam
- Observed by: Tamil and Malayali Hindus, and Caribbean Shaktism
- Type: Hindu
- Significance: Shiva's manifestation as Jyotirlinga; Origin of Kartikeya; Veneration of Parvati
- Celebrations: Puja, celebrations, lighting of bonfires and lamps
- Date: Kṛttikā nakshatra in the Tamil month of Karthigai
- 2025 date: 3 December
- Frequency: Annual

Karthika Deepam (Tamil: Kārtikai Tīpam) or Thrikarthika, is a Hindu festival of lights. It is mainly observed by Tamils and Malayalis in India, Sri Lanka and other regions with significant Tamil diaspora. It is celebrated on the first full moon day (purnima) of the Tamil calendar month of Karthigai coinciding with nakshatra of Kṛttikā, and falls on the Gregorian month of November or December. Though it corresponds to the Kartik Purnima, it falls on a different day due to the correction of equinoxes in the Tamil calendar.

The festival is associated with Shaivism, commemorates the origin of Kartikeya and Shiva's manifestation as Jyotirlinga. In Kerala, it is celebrated as Thrikarthika, in honour of goddess Parvati.

== History ==
One of the earliest references to the festival is found in the Tamil anthology Akanaṉūṟu, dating back to the Sangam period (200 BCE to 300 CE). The festival is referred in songs of poetess Avvaiyar. The festival is also referred in the Sangam literature as Peruviḻa.

== Mythology ==
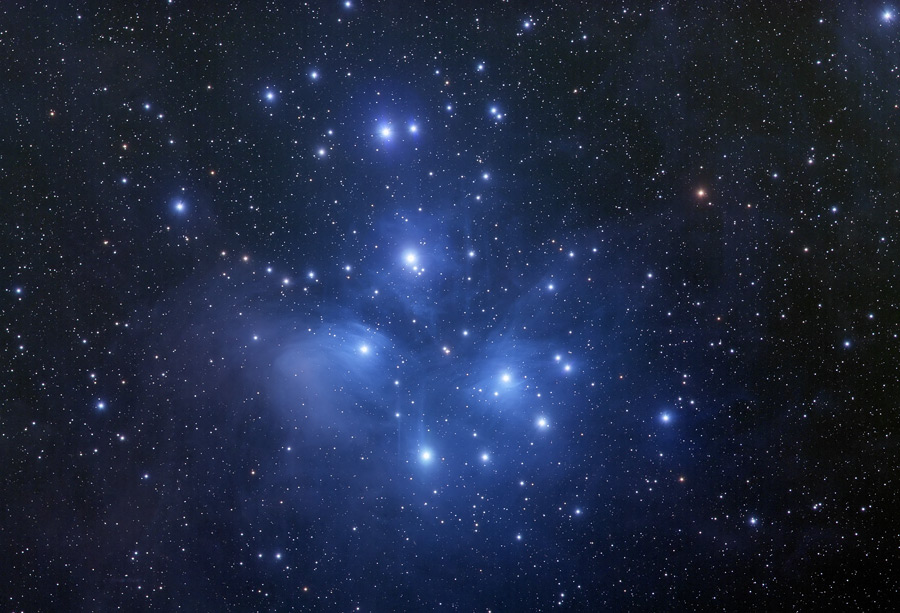
The Pleiades (Kṛttikā) constellation.

According to the Kanda Puranam, three asuras (a race of celestial beings) – Surapadman, Tarakasuran, and Singamukhan, performed austerities to propitiate the Hindu god Shiva. Shiva granted them various boons which gave them near-immortality and the ability to conquer the three worlds. They subsequently started a reign of tyranny in their respective realms which forced the celestial beings devas to plead with Shiva for his assistance. In response, Shiva manifested five additional heads and a divine spark emerged from each of the six heads. The sparks were carried by wind-god Vayu, and fire-god Agni to the Ganga river. The water in the Ganga started evaporating due to the intense heat from the sparks, and the goddess Ganga took them to the Saravana lake, where each of the sparks developed into a baby boy. The six boys were raised by handmaidens known as the Kṛttikās and they were later fused into one by Parvati, thus giving rise to the six-headed Kartikeya. As per Hindu mythology, the six Kṛttikās–Śiva, Sambhūti, Prīti, Sannati, Anasūya, and Kṣamā, who helped in rearing the child, were granted with immortality by Shiva and transformed to become eternal stars in the sky as a part of the Pleiades star cluster. The festival commemorates the Kṛttikās and the day Parvati united the six forms of Kartikeya.

According to the Shiva Purana, Brahma (god of creation) and Vishnu (god of preservation) had an argument over their supremacy. To settle the debate, Shiva took the form of jyotirlinga, a huge column of fire or light, stretching across the three worlds. Vishnu took the form of a boar and descended to locate the bottom of the column, while Brahma assumed the form of a swan to locate its top. Vishnu failed in his search and returned, honest about the outcome of his quest. Brahma chanced upon a ketaki flower in the midst of his ascent. Upon enquiry, he learned that the flower had been descending from the column for several years. He bade the flower to lie to Vishnu that he had seen the top of the column. The dishonesty of Brahma angered Shiva, causing him to curse Brahma that he would not be worshipped. He also declared that Vishnu would be eternally worshipped for his honesty. The festival is celebrated to commemorate the manifestation of Shiva as jyotirlinga.

== Occurrence ==
Karthika Deepam is a Hindu festival of lights observed mainly by Tamils in India, Sri Lanka and other regions with significant Tamil diaspora. The festival is celebrated on the first full moon day of the Tamil calendar month of Karthigai coinciding with the Kṛttikā nakshatra, usually falling on the Gregorian months of November or December. Though it corresponds to the Kartik Purnima, it falls on a different day due to the correction of equinoxes in the Tamil calendar. In Kerala, the festival is known as Thrikarthika, and is celebrated in as a form of veneration to goddess Parvati.

== Practices ==
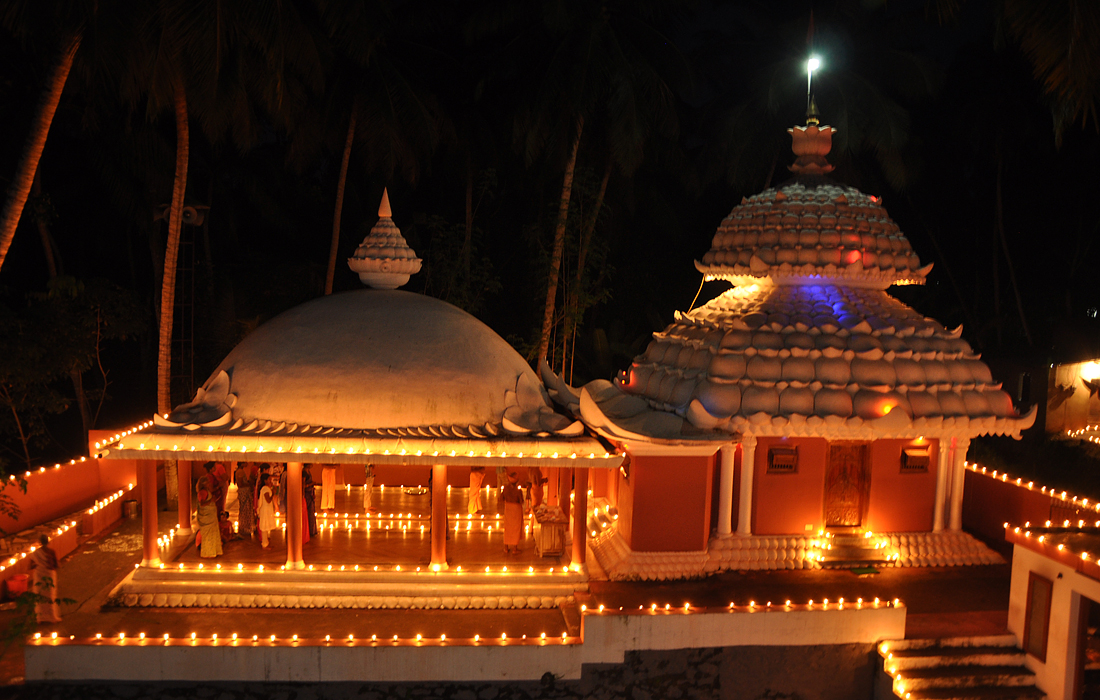
Buildings are decorated with oil lamps during the festival, pictured here Nizhal Thangal, Attoor

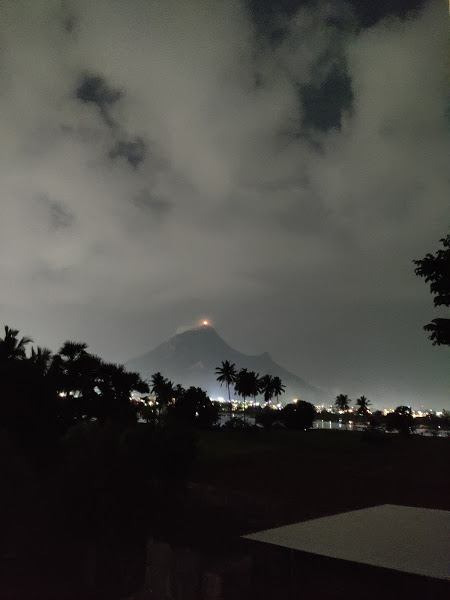
A large ghee lamp is lit atop the Arunachala hill in Tiruvannamalai.

On the occasion of the festival, people light oil lamps usually made of clay. The oil lamps are considered auspicious symbols in Hinduism and is believed to ward off evil forces, and usher in prosperity and joy. People also burst fire crackers, and exchange sweets. Maavali is a traditional firework made from burnt palmyra flowers and spun around to create sparks.

In Hindu temples, special pujas are performed and a lamp cauldron is usually lit on the occasion of the festival. In Tiruvannamalai, the festival is marked by the lighting of a large ghee lamp atop the Arunachala hill. Millions of devotees participate in the car festival of Arunachalesvara Temple at Tiruvannamalai and circumambulate the hill.

On the occasion of Thrikarthika, oil lamps are lit after sunset. The lamps are decorated by leaves from coconut and mango trees and placed on banana stems. Special dishes are prepared, and offerings are made to cattle.

== See also ==
- Rakher Upobash – Annual Bengali Hindu religious festival in Bangladesh
- Thiruvathira – Hindu festival dedicated to the god Shiva
