= Karthigai =

- Native name: Kārtikai
- Calendar: Tamil calendar
- Month number: 8
- Number of days: 29 or 30
- Season: Kulir (autumn)
- Gregorian equivalent: November–December
- Significant days: Karthigai Deepam; Kathigai Pournami

Karthigai is the eighth month of the Tamil calendar. The name of the month is derived from the position of the Moon near the Kiruthigai nakshatra (star) on the pournami (full moon) day. The month corresponds to kulir kaalam (autumn season) and falls in November–December in the Gregorian calendar.

In the Hindu lunar calendar, it corresponds to the eighth month of Kartika, falling in the Gregorian months of October–November.

In the Hindu solar calendar, it corresponds to the eighth month of Vrscika and begins with the Sun's entry into Scorpio.

In the Vaishnav calendar, it corresponds to the eighth month of Damodara.

== Festivals ==
The Purnima (full moon day) of the month is celebrated as various festivals by the Tamils. Karthika Deepam is a festival of lights observed mainly by the Tamils on the day. The festival is celebrated on the full moon day of the month coinciding with the Kṛttikā nakshatra. The festival is dedicated to god Murugan and is commemorated by lighting deepams outside and inside the homes. Karthigai Pournami involves pilgrimages, lamp-lighting and ritual bathing in sacred rivers.

== See also ==
- Astronomical basis of the Hindu calendar
- Hindu astronomy
