= Arunachala =

Hill and holy site in Tamil Nadu, India

- Annamalai
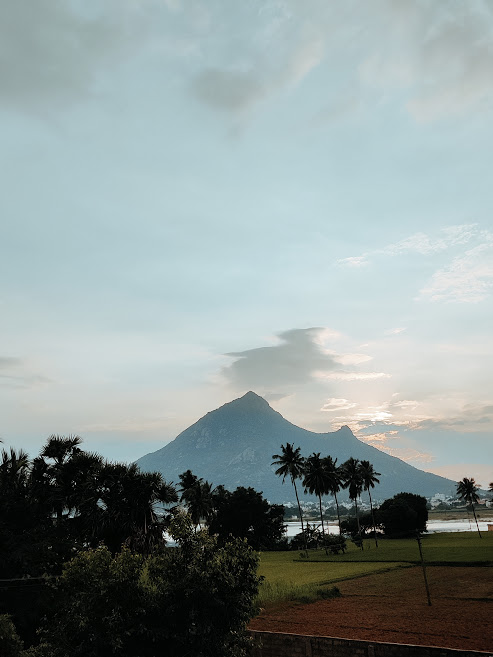

Highest point
- Elevation: 814 m (2,671 ft)
- Coordinates: 12°14′28″N 79°03′26″E

Geography
- Location within Tamil Nadu
- Location: Tiruvannamalai district, Tamil Nadu, India
- Parent range: Eastern Ghats

Arunachala (IAST: Aruṇācalam [əɾʊˈɳaːtʃələ], 'Red Mountain') is a hill in Tiruvannamalai district, Tamil Nadu, and one of the five main Shaiva holy places in South India. The Arunachalesvara Temple to Shiva is located at the base of the hill. The hill is also known by the names Annamalai, Annamalaiyar Hill, Arunagiri, Arunachalam, Arunai, Sonagiri, and Sonachalam.

Every year in the Tamil month of Kārttikai (November–December), the Kārttikai tīpam light is lit atop the hill.

It is also an important place for devotees of Ramana Maharshi, with Sri Ramana Ashram situated at its foothills.

== References in religious texts ==
According to the legend, associated with the Temple, a dispute occurred between Brahma the creator, and Vishnu the preserver, over which of them was superior. In order to settle the argument, Lord Shiva is said to have manifested as a column of light, and then the form of Arunachala. But Brahma and Vishnu forgot their highest sacred duties and competed with each other. To solve this, Lord Shiva got up to test the heavens and the earth, saying that the one who sees his head and feet is the greatest among you. Brahma and Vishnu, no matter how hard they tried, failed miserably. Following this, the Devas, who could not bear the heat, prayed to Lord Shiva for peace. Lord Shiva, in response to their request, bowed down to a mountain and a small torch appeared on top of it, and everyone worshiped. The place is also known as Thiruvannamalai, also known as Arunachalam, the site of the fire. The Karthika lamp is mounted on this hill every year during the month of Karthika. Tens of thousands of people flock to Thiruvannamalai on that day.

Creation is an action of Brahma;
Maintenance is done by Vishnu;
Destruction (Renewal) is attributed to Shiva

The Maheswara Khanda of Skanda Purana, sage Veda Vyasa describes in great detail the wonder of Arunachala.

Over the centuries, many saints and sages have been drawn to Arunachala. The Shaivite saints of 5th to 10th CE Appar, Sambandar, Sundarar and Manikkavacakar are four examples. In the fifteenth century, Guhai Namasivaya, Guru Namasivaya and Virupaksha Deva came from Karnataka and settled on Arunachala. Saint Namasivaya lived in one of Arunachala's caves which is still known by his name. Virupaksha Deva lived in an OM-shaped cave higher up on the Hill, and this cave too still bears his name. Located on the south-east slope of Arunachala, this was the cave that Sri Ramana Maharshi lived in from 1899 to 1916.

Arunachala Mahatmyam says,

"By seeing Chidambaram, by being born in Tiruvarur, by dying in Kasi, or by merely thinking of Arunachala, one will surely attain Liberation."

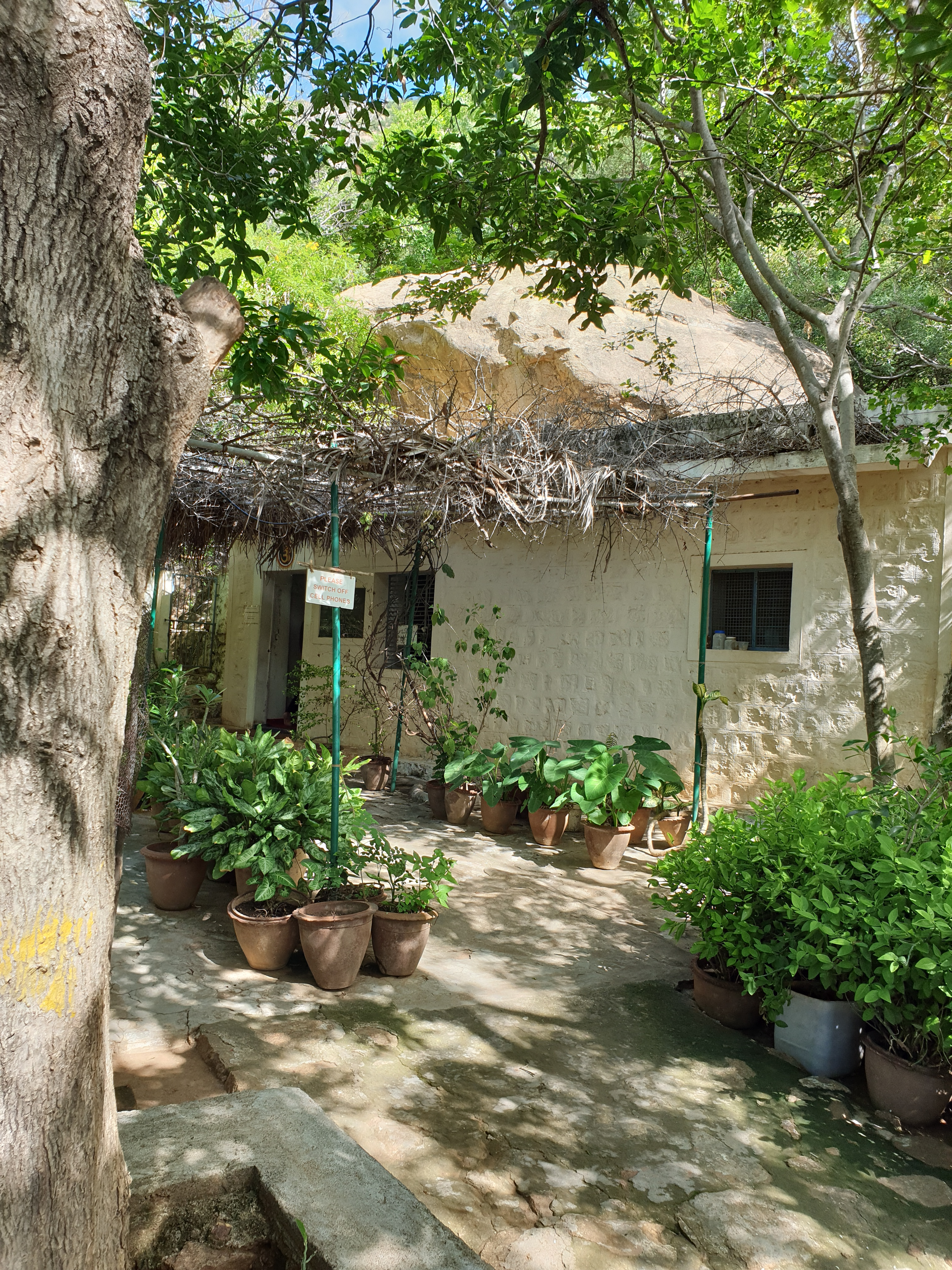
Virupaksha Cave, on southeastern slope, Arunachala where Ramana Maharishi stayed the 17 years.

Another verse in the Arunachala Mahatmyam, translated from Sanskrit into Tamil by Sri Ramana Maharshi says:

"Arunachala is truly the holy place. Of all holy places it is the most sacred! Know that it is the heart of the world. It is truly Siva himself! It is his heart-abode, a secret kshetra. In that place the Lord ever abides the hill of light named Arunachala."

Asked about the special sanctity of Arunachala, Ramana Maharshi said that other holy places such as Kailash, Varanasi and Rishikesh are sacred because they are the abodes of Lord Shiva whereas Arunachala is Lord Shiva himself. However, as the above verse of Arunachala Mahatmyam says, Arunachala is a secret kshetra. It is this place that bestows jnana (Self-knowledge) and because most people have so many other desires and do not truly want jnana, Arunachala has always remained comparatively little known. But to those few who seek jnana, Arunachala always makes itself known through some means or other.

"All stones in that place Arunachala are lingams. It is indeed the abode of Lord Siva. All trees are the wish-granting trees of Indra's heaven. Its rippling waters are the Ganges, flowing through our Lord's matted locks. The food eaten there is the ambrosia of the Gods. To go round it in pradakshina is to perform pradakshina of the world. Words spoken there are holy scripture, and to fall asleep there is to be absorbed in samadhi, beyond the mind's delusion. Could there be any other place which is its equal?"

-source: Tamil Arunachala Puranam,

== Girivalam ==
The circumambulation of Arunachala is known as Malai Suttru in Tamil. Performing pradakshina of Arunachala is considered to be beneficial in all ways. Typically, pradakshina is done in bare feet, with the Hill on the right. Sri Ramana Maharshi once explained the meaning of the word pradakshina and how it should be done by a devotee: "The letter "Pra" stands for removal of all kinds of sins; "da" stands for fulfilling the desires; "kshi" stands for freedom from future births; "na" stands for giving deliverance through jnana. If by way of Pradakshina you walk one step it gives happiness in this world, two steps, it gives happiness in heaven, three steps, it gives bliss of Satyaloka which can be attained. One should go round either in mouna (silence) or dhyana (meditation) or japa (repetition of Lord's name) or sankeertana (bhajan) and thereby think of God all the time. One should walk slowly like a woman who is in the ninth month of pregnancy."

Throughout the year, pilgrims engage in a practise called giri valam (circumambulation of Annamalaiyar temple and Arunachala 14 km in circumference), considered to be a simple and effective form of yoga. The circumambulation is started from the temple with bare feet and is considered a sacred act. The central government of India asked the Tamil Nadu government through the supreme court to direct the path of girivalam under the provision of the proposed Tamil Nadu Heritage Conservation Act. There are eight small shrines of lingams located in the 14 km circumference of the hill, each associated with the 12 moon signs. These are collectively termed as Ashta Lingam (meaning 8 lingams) and is considered one of the rituals of worship during the girivalam (circumbulation of the hill).

== Karthigai Deepam ==
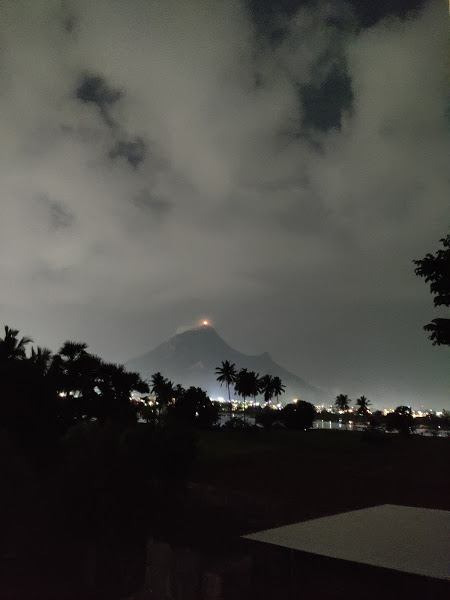
Karthikai Deepam 2020

Every year, on the tenth day of the celebration of Karthikai, devotees take embers in pots from the sacred fire lit in the Arunachaleswara temple and carry them to the top of Arunachala, along with cloth wicks. An enormous cauldron is placed on the highest of Arunachala's five peaks and filled with hundreds of gallons of ghee mixed with camphor. At precisely six o'clock, as the sun sets and the full moon rises, lights are lit on the top of the Hill, on a flagstaff in the temple, and at Sri Ramanasramam, accompanied by chants of Arunachala Siva by the vast crowds. The fire on top of Arunachala can be seen for miles around. Sri Ramana Maharshi described the meaning of this event in this way:

"Getting rid of the 'I am the body' idea and merging the mind into the Heart to realize the Self as non-dual being and the light of all is the real significance of darshan of the beacon of light on Annamalai, the centre of the universe."

== Temple ==
The temple is famous for its massive gopurams, some of which reach as high as 66 m. It is made up of three nested rectangular walls each of which was built during different periods; the innermost could have been built as early as the 7th century by Pallavas. It was later refurbished by the kings Cholas, Pandyas, Hoysalass, and Vijayanagara Empire from 10th through the 17th century. The temple is renowned for some of the remarkable carvings on the walls. In one particular carving Lord Shiva is shown as dancing in an elephant's skin.

== Reforestation ==
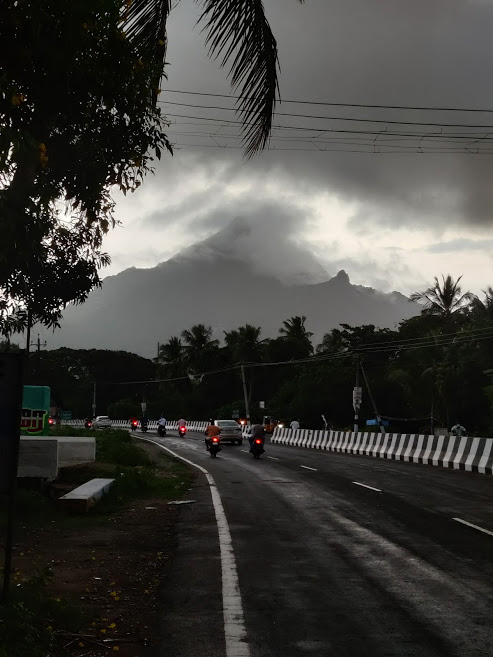
Arunachala during winter – view from Vengikkal

Arunachala is in the South Deccan Plateau dry deciduous forests ecoregion. The forests that once covered the mountain have been reduced by fires, illegal logging, and the footfalls of thousands of pilgrims. Reforestation of Arunachala began in the 1990s by a civil society initiative called Annamalai Reforestation Society. In 2004 the Tiruvannamalai Greening Society was founded by district forest officer Pasupathy Raj and other local officials. The society registered as a non-profit trust in 2008 called The Forest Way.

The Forest Way employs full-time and part-time staff and engages volunteers to grow seedlings of native trees and plant them on the mountain. The charity operates a plant nursery, and plants 15,000-18,000 seedlings each year. The charity helped build a children's park and forest park on the site of a former dump, removes litter from the mountain, and watches for fires and creates fire breaks during the dry season.

== Arunachala in popular culture ==
"Arunachala" is the first track of the Pervogenesis album by The Kristet Utseende.

== See also ==
- Sacred mountains of India
- Velliangiri Mountains
