= Girivalam =

Hindu religious practice

Girivalam is a Hindu religious practice held in Tiruvannamalai, India, that involves devotees embarking on a sacred pilgrimage around the foothills of Arunachala, also known as Annamalai Hill, mainly on full moon nights.

== Background ==
The town of Tiruvannamalai holds spiritual importance, due to the presence of the ancient Arunachaleswarar Temple, dedicated to the god Shiva. Situated at the base of Arunachala Hill, the temple serves as a starting point for the circumambulation. The practice of Girivalam involves walking a distance of approximately 14 km (8.7 mi) around the hill, following the designated Girivalam Path.

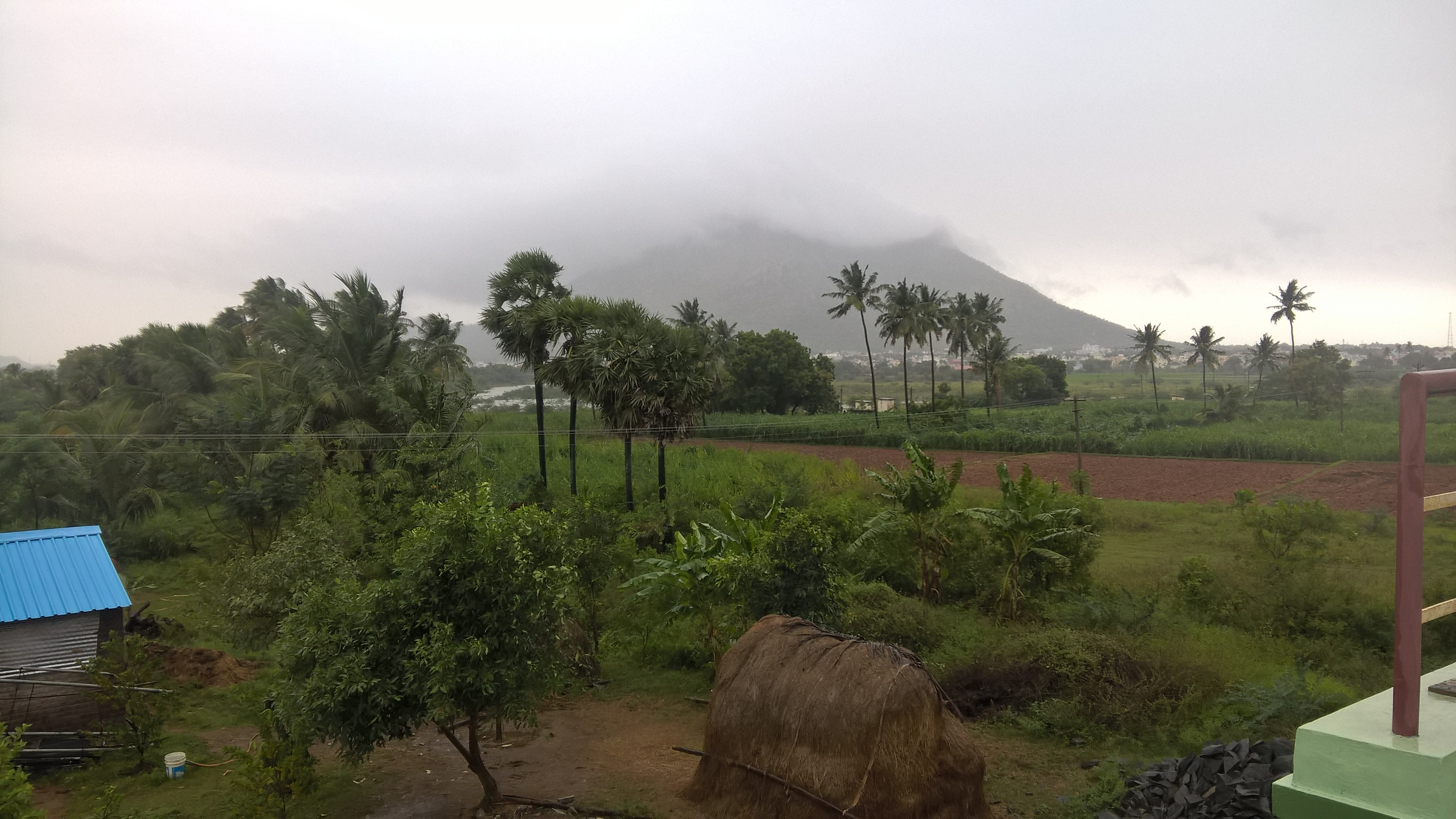
Annamalai covered by clouds during winter and rainy seasons

The circumambulation of Arunachala is known as Giri Pradakshina in Sanskrit and Girivalam or Malai Suttru in Tamil. Performing pradakshina of Arunachala is considered to be beneficial in all ways. Typically, pradakshina is done in bare feet, with the Hill on the right. Ramana Maharshi once explained the meaning of the word pradakshina and how it should be done by a devotee: "The letter "Pra" stands for removal of all kinds of sins; "da" stands for fulfilling the desires; "kshi" stands for freedom from future births; "na" stands for giving deliverance through jnana. If by way of Pradakshina you walk one step it gives happiness in this world, two steps, it gives happiness in heaven, three steps, it gives bliss of Satyaloka which can be attained. One should go round either in mouna (silence) or dhyana (meditation) or japa (repetition of Lord's name) or sankeertana (bhajan) and thereby think of God all the time. One should walk slowly like a woman who is in the ninth month of pregnancy."

Throughout the year, pilgrims engage in a practise called giri valam, considered to be a simple and effective form of yoga. The circumambulation is started from the temple with bare feet and is considered a sacred act. The central government of India asked the Tamil Nadu government through the supreme court to direct the path of girivalam under the provision of the proposed Tamil Nadu Heritage Conservation Act. There are eight small shrines of lingams located in the 14 km circumference of the hill, each associated with the 12 moon signs. These are collectively termed as Ashta Lingam (meaning 8 lingams) and is considered one of the rituals of worship during the girivalam (circumbulation of the hill).

Lingam	Moon Sign	Direction
Indra Lingam	Vṛṣabha, Tulā (Taurus, Libra)	East
Agni Lingam	Siṃha (Leo)	South East
Yama Lingam	Vṛścika (Scorpio)	South
Niruthi Lingam	Meṣa (Aries)	South West
Varuna Lingam	Makara, Kumbha (Capricorn, Aquarius)	West
Vayu Lingam	Karka (Cancer)	North West
Kubera Lingam	Dhanuṣa, Mīna (Sagittarius, Pisces)	North
Easanya Lingam	Mithuna, Kanyā (Gemini, Virgo)	North East

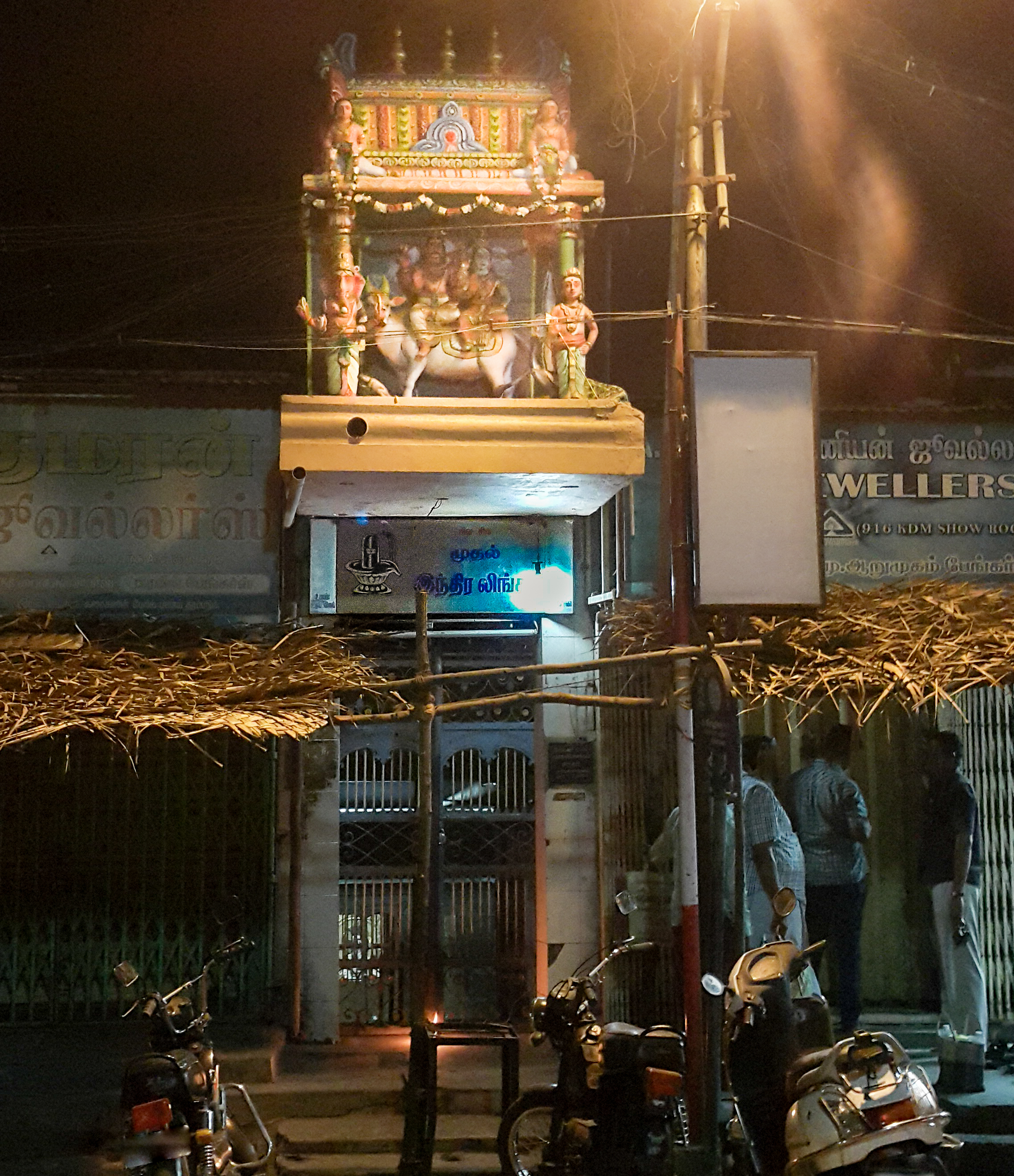
1. Indra lingam

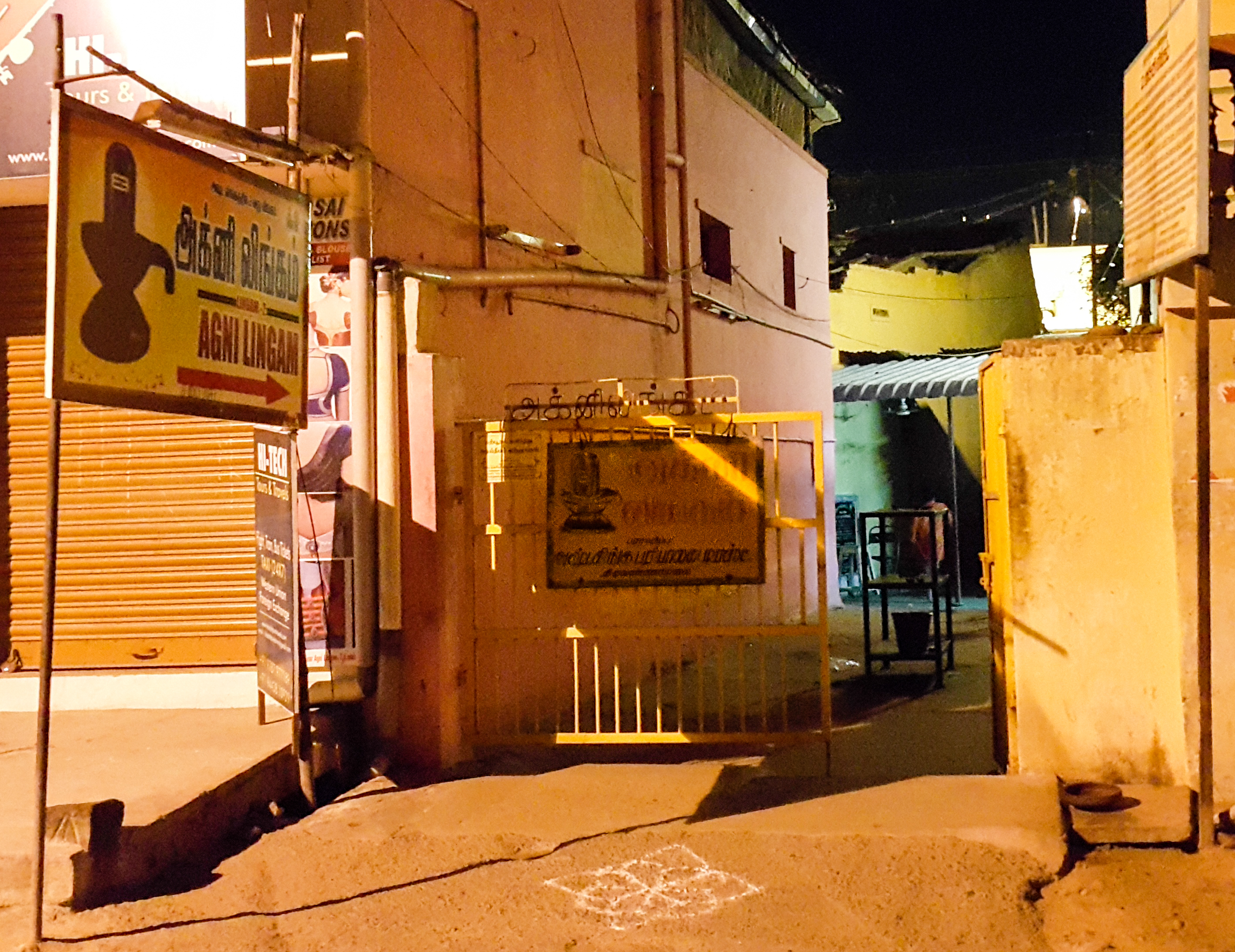
2. Agni lingam

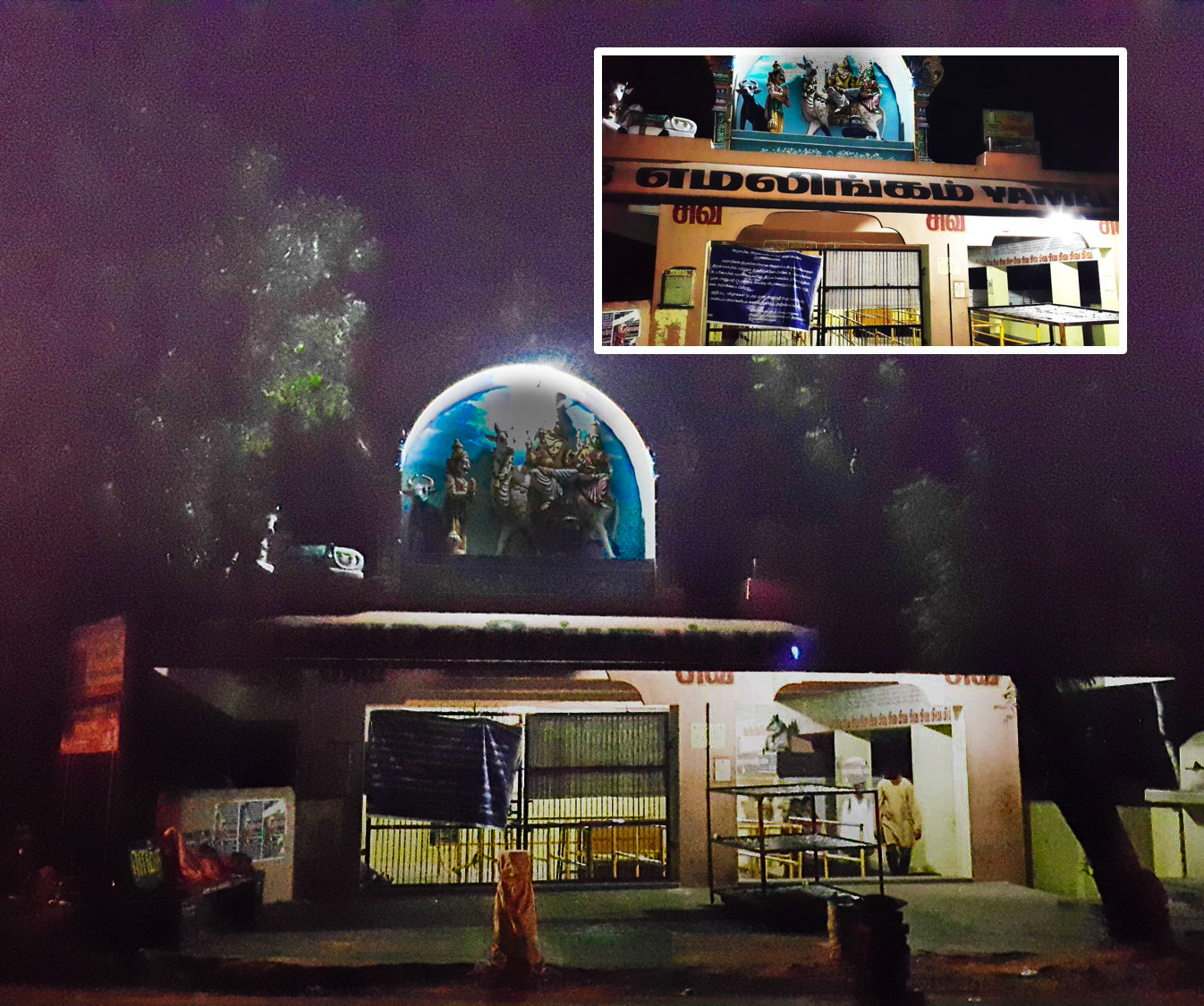
3. Yama lingam

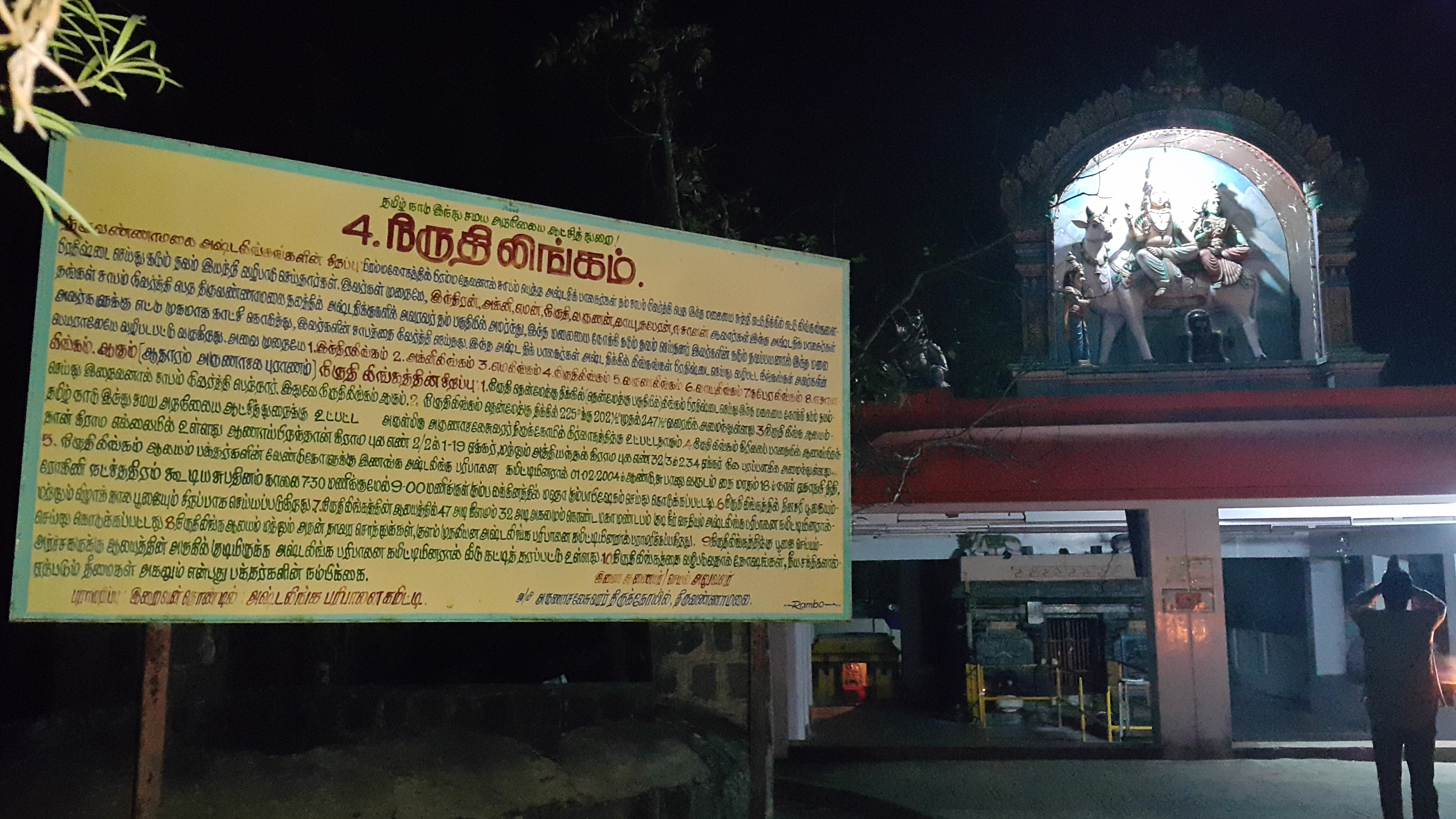
4. Niruthi lingam
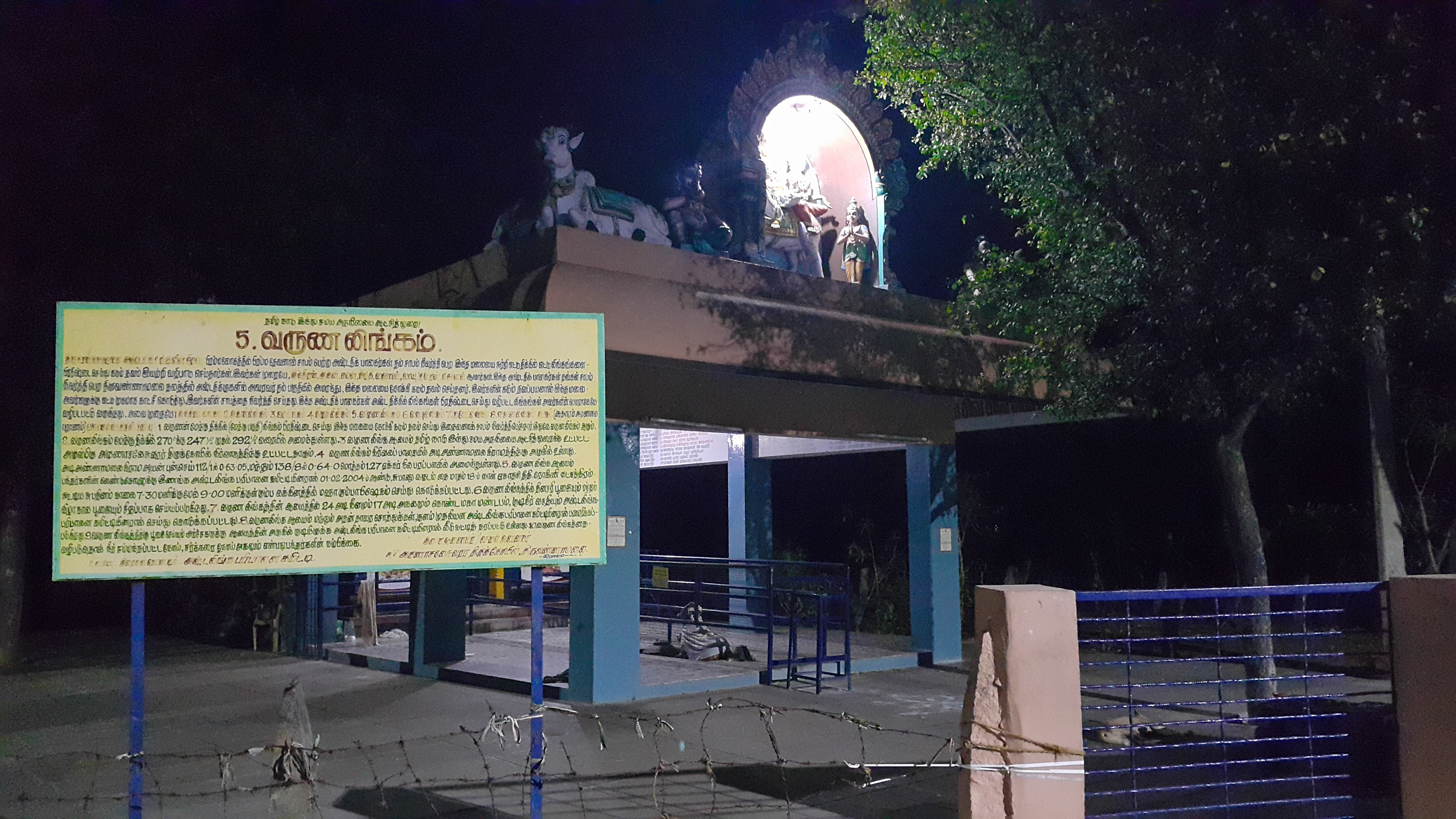
5. Varuna lingam

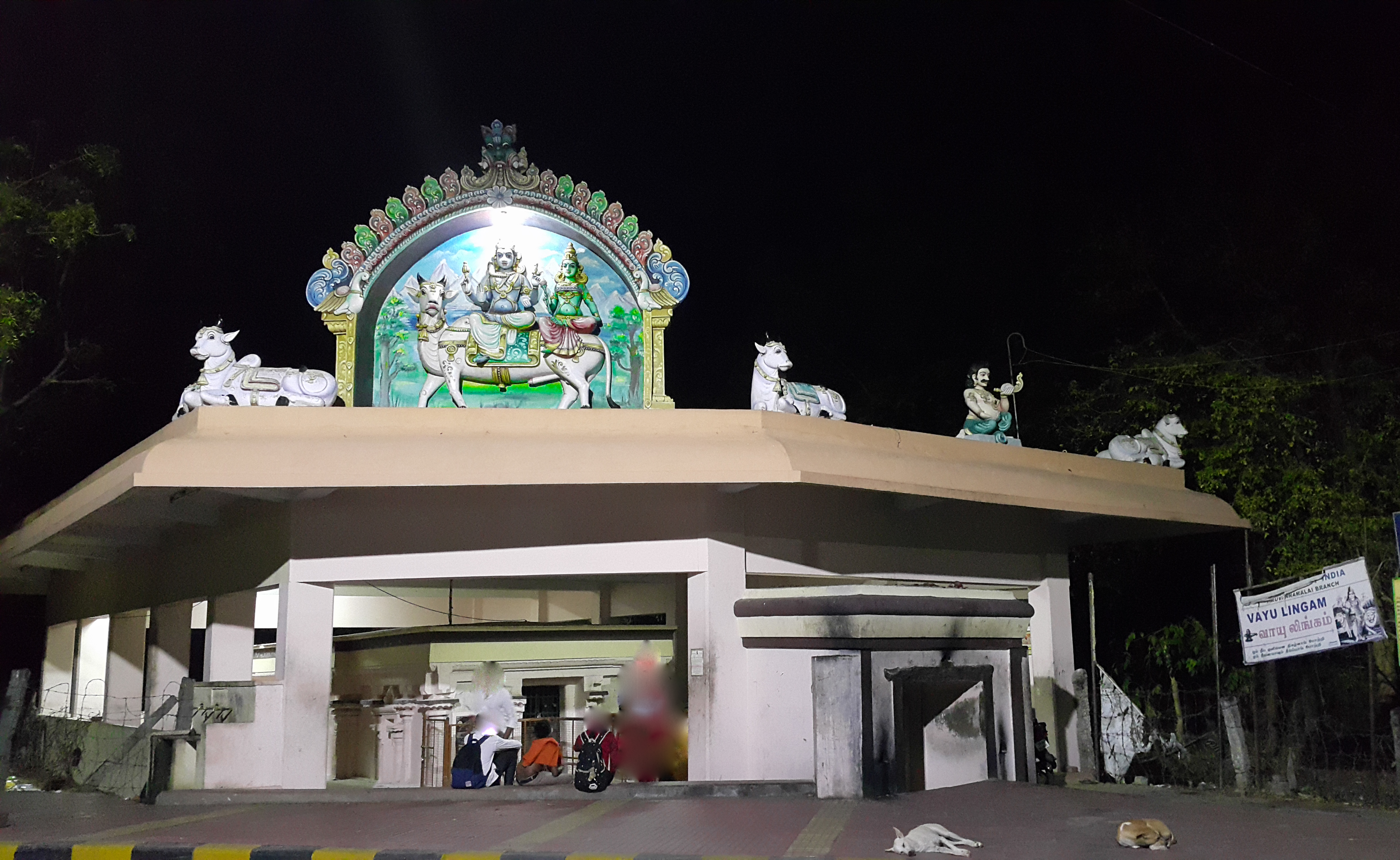
6. Vayu lingam

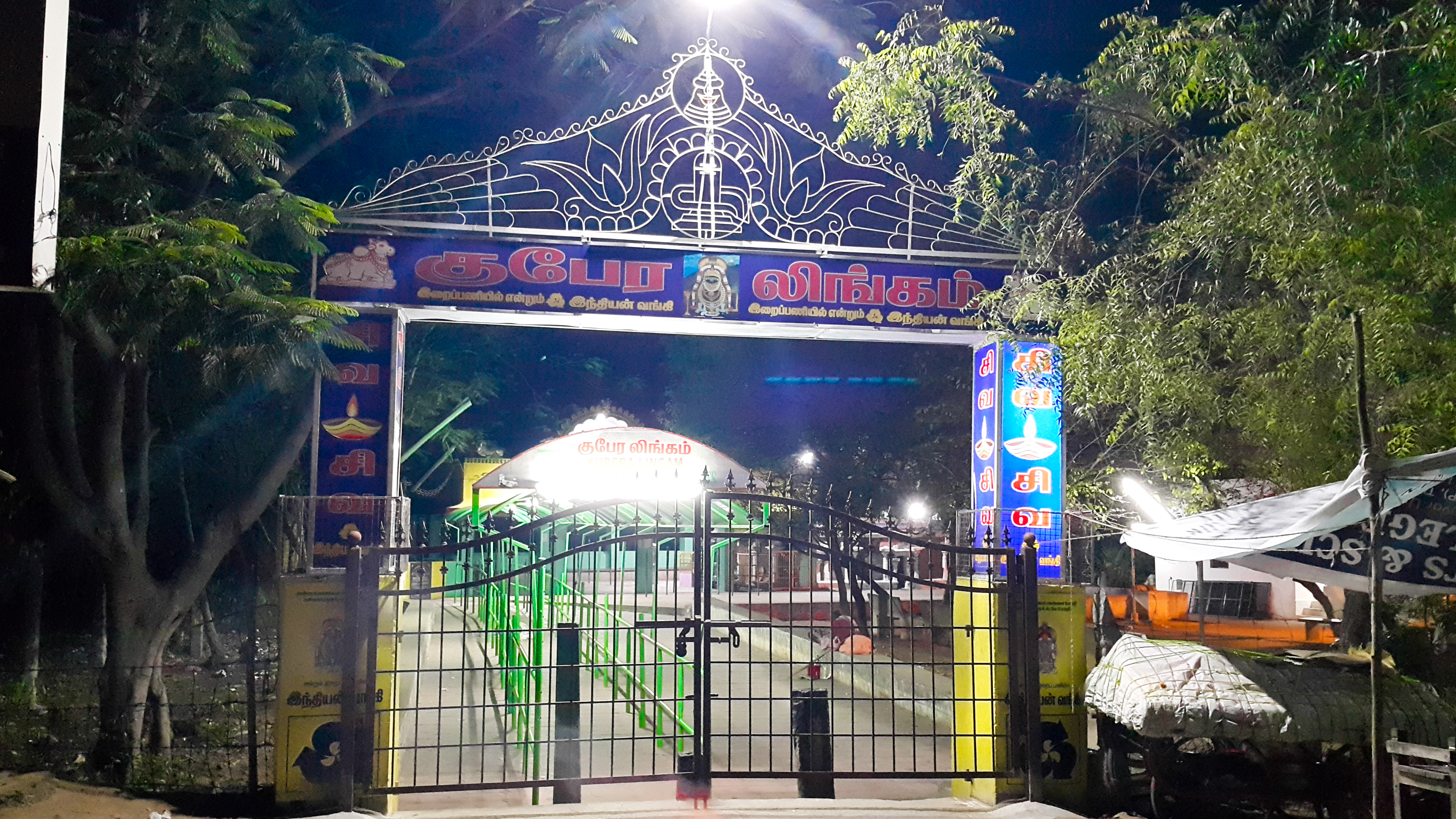
7. Kubera lingam

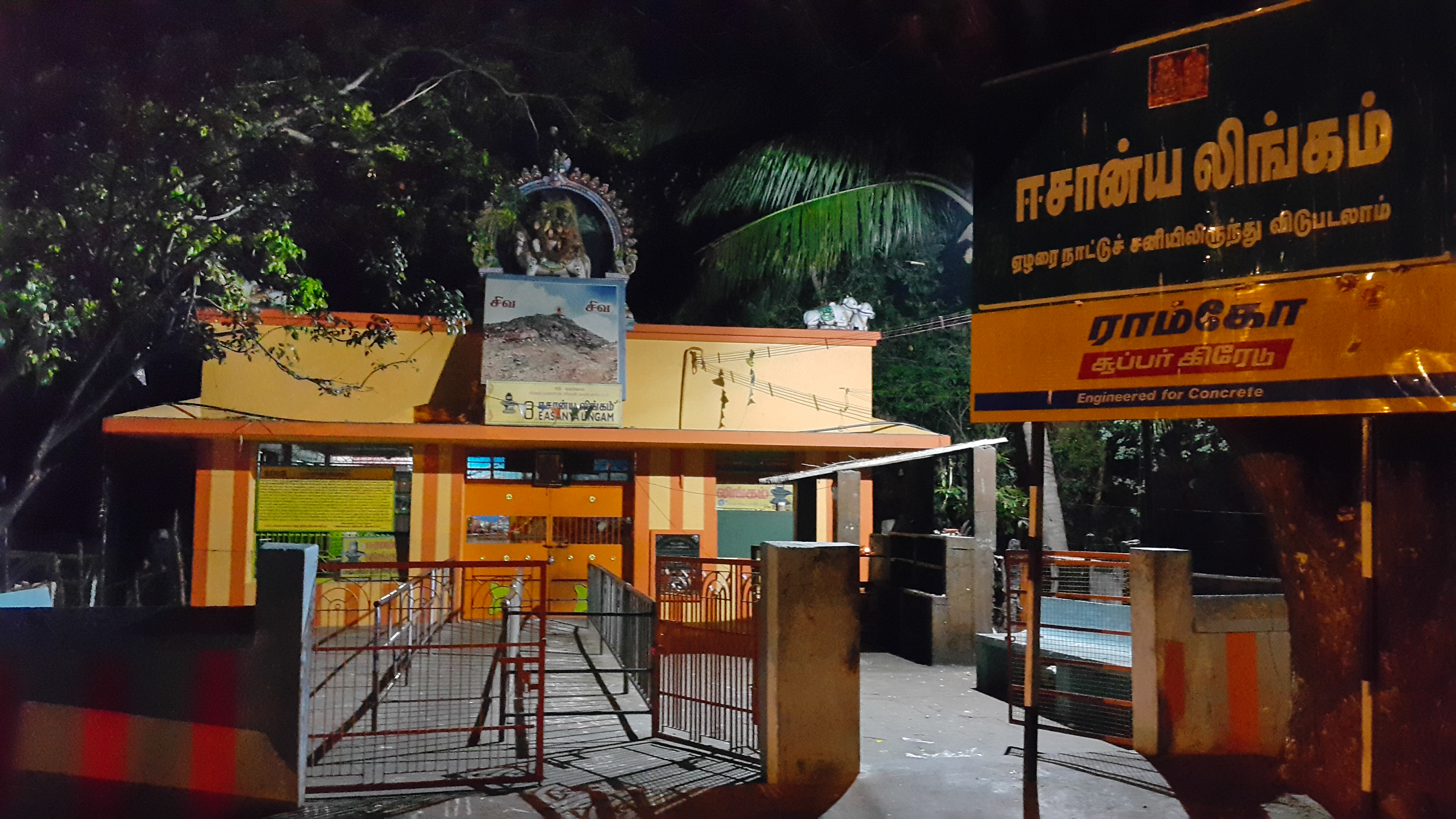
8. Easanya lingam
