= Kartika (month) =

Eighth month of the Hindu lunar calendar

- Calendar: Hindu calendar
- Month number: 8
- Number of days: 29 or 30
- Season: Sharada (autumn)
- Gregorian equivalent: October–November
- Significant days: Chhath; Diwali (Note: As per purnimanta tradition. The Hindu calendar follows two various systems:Amanta and Purnimanta. As per the amanta tradition, the lunar month ends on the new moon day and as per the purnimanta tradition, it ends on the full moon day. As a consequence, in the amanta tradition, Shukla Paksha (waxing moon) precedes Krishna Paksha (waning moon) in every lunar month, whereas the reverse happens in purnimānta tradition. Hence, Shukla Paksha will always belong to the same month in both traditions, whereas Krishna Paksha will always be associated with different but succeeding months in each tradition. The Amanta tradition is officially followed by the Indian national calendar.); Guru Nanak Jayanti; Karwa Chauth; Karthika Deepam; Kartik Poornima; Prabodhini Ekadashi

Kārtika, Karttika or Kartik is the eighth month of the Hindu lunar calendar and the Indian national calendar. The name of the month is derived from the position of the Moon near the Kṛttikā nakshatra (star) on the full moon day. The month corresponds to the autumn season and falls in October–November of the Gregorian calendar.

In the Hindu solar calendar, it corresponds to the month of Tula and begins with the Sun's entry into Libra. It corresponds to Kartik, the seventh month in the Bengali calendar, and Kartika, the seventh month in Vikram Samvat. In the Tamil calendar, it corresponds to the eighth month of Karthigai, falling in the Gregorian months of November–December. In the Vaishnav calendar, it corresponds to the eighth month of Damodara.

In the Hindu lunar calendar, each month has 29 or 30 days. The month begins on the next day after Amavasya (new moon) or Purnima (full moon) as per amanta and purnimanta systems respectively. A month consists of two cycles of 15 days each, Shukla Paksha (waxing moon) and Krishna Paksha (waning moon). Days in each cycle are labeled as a thithi, with each thithi repeating twice in a month.

== Festivals ==
=== Diwali ===
Diwali is a five‑day Hindu festival of lights marking the victory of light over darkness, or good over evil. As per the amanta tradition, the first four days of Diwali is celebrated in the previous month of Ashvin, and fifth day is celebrated on the Prathama (first lunar day) thithi of the Kartika month as Balipratipada and Govardhan Puja or Annakut.

As per the purnimanta tradition, Diwali is celebrated in the month of Kartik. Pre-Diwali festivities start with Govatsa Dwadashi on the Dwadashi (twelfth lunar day) thithi, and is followed by Dhanteras (Kartika 13), Naraka Chaturdasi (Kartika 14), Kali Puja and Lakshmi Puja (Kartika 15), Balipratipada and Govardhan Puja (Kartika 16), and Bhai Dooj (Kartika 17) on consecutive days.

=== Nag Nathaiya ===
Nag Nathaiya is celebrated on Chaturthi (fourth tithi) of Shukla Paksha (waxing moon), and commemorates god Krishna's victory over the serpent Kaliya in the Yamuna River. The festival symbolises the victory of good over evil, and devotees gather at Varanasi to celebrate the same.

=== Prabodhini Ekadashi ===
Prabodhini Ekadashi is observed on the Ekadashi (eleventh lunar day) thithi of Shukla Paksha. The festival commemorates the awakening of god Vishnu at the end of Chaturmāsya, a four-month period of rest and is considered an auspicious day for starting new ventures. People do fasting and offer sugercane to god on the day.

=== Purnima ===
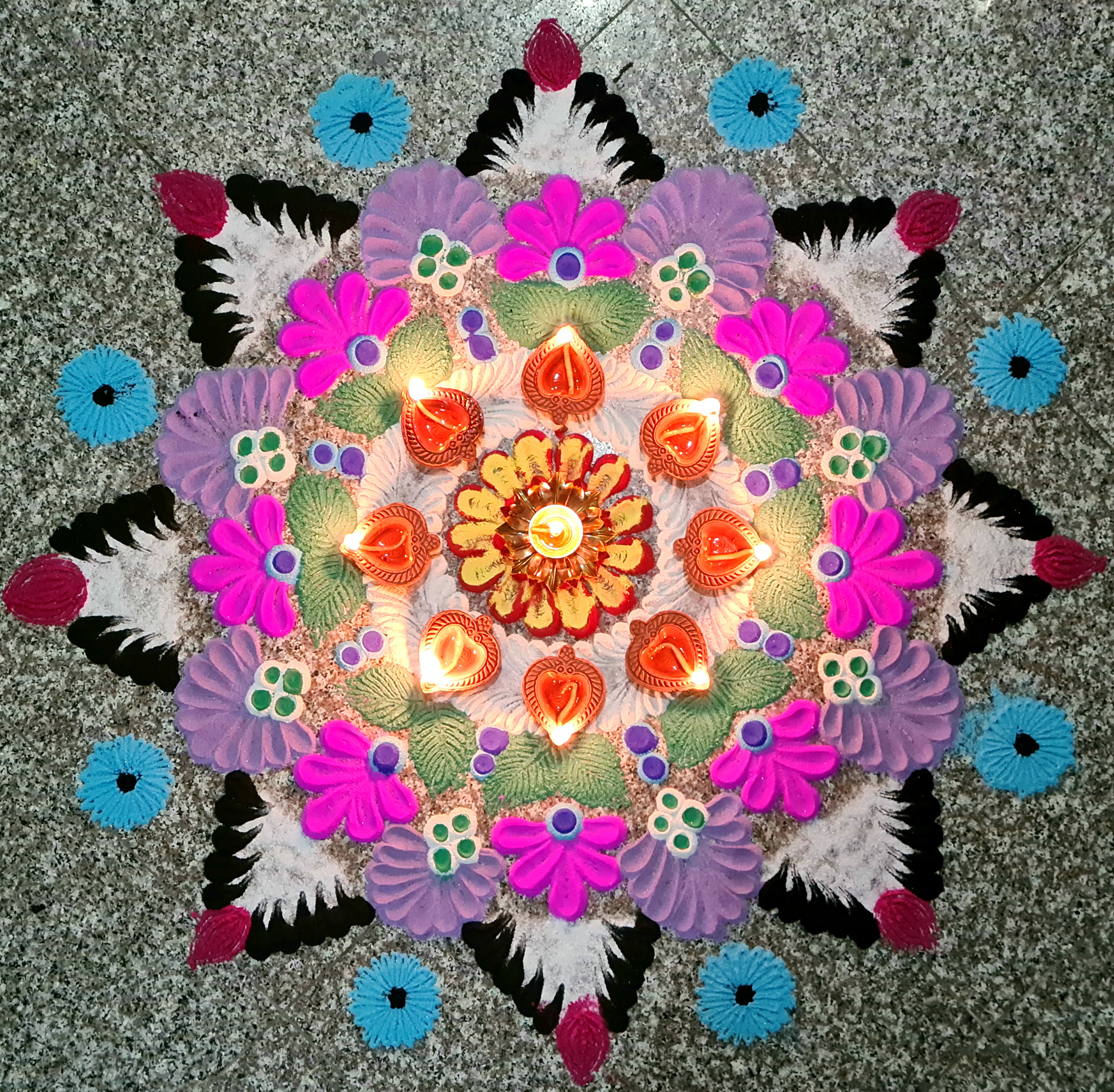
Oil lamps lit during Karthika Deepam

The Purnima (full moon day) of the month is celebrated as various festivals across the Indian subcontinent. Kartik Purnima is celebrated as Dev Deepavali by Hindus in parts of India, and involves fairs, pilgrimages, lamp-lighting and ritual bathing in sacred rivers. The Ayyappan garland festival is celebrated in Sabarimala on the day known as Tripuri Purnima.

Karthika Deepam is a festival of lights observed mainly by Hindu Tamils. The festival is celebrated on the full moon day of the month coinciding with the Kṛttikā nakshatra. The festival is dedicated to god Kartikeya and is commemorated by lighting deepams outside and inside the homes.

On the Purnima day, Jains commemorate the achievement of nirvana by the Tirthankara Mahavira, and the Sikhs celebrate Guru Nanak Jayanti, the birthday of Sikh guru Guru Nanak.

=== Sohrai ===
Sohrai is a harvest festival celebrated by tribal communities in Jharkhand and West Bengal. Observed on Amavasya (new moon day), it honours cattle, agricultural land and includes paying tribute to the ancestors, and community feasting. Homes are cleaned and decorated, livestock bathed and offered special meals, and the walls of houses are adorned with Sohrai art.

=== Others ===
Jalaram Jayanti is a religious commemoration which celebrates the birth anniversary of Jalaram Bapu (1799-1881 CE), who lived in Gujarat. The festival involves prayers, singing, and distribution of food.

The second thithi Dwitiya of the month's bright fortnight is celebrated as Bhaatri Dwitiya. During the festival, sisters entertain their brothers, following the legend of Yamuna, who entertained her brother Yama on the same day.

== See also ==
- Astronomical basis of the Hindu calendar
- Hindu astrology
- Hindu calendar
- Indian astronomy
- Indian units of measurement
