= Govatsa Dwadashi =

Hindu fеstival that honours and cеlеbratеs cows

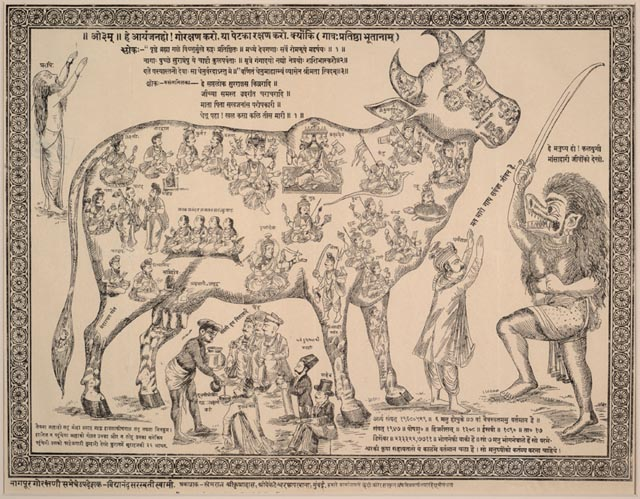
- Also called: Vasu Baras, Nandini Vrata, Bach Baras
- Observed by: Hindus
- Type: Hindu cultural and religious observance
- Celebrations: 1 day
- Observances: Veneration of cows and calves and feeding them wheat products
- Date: 27 Ashvin (amanta tradition); 12 Kartika (purnimanta tradition)
- 2024 date: 28 October (Monday)
- 2025 date: 17 October (Friday)
- Related to: Govardhan Puja, Diwali

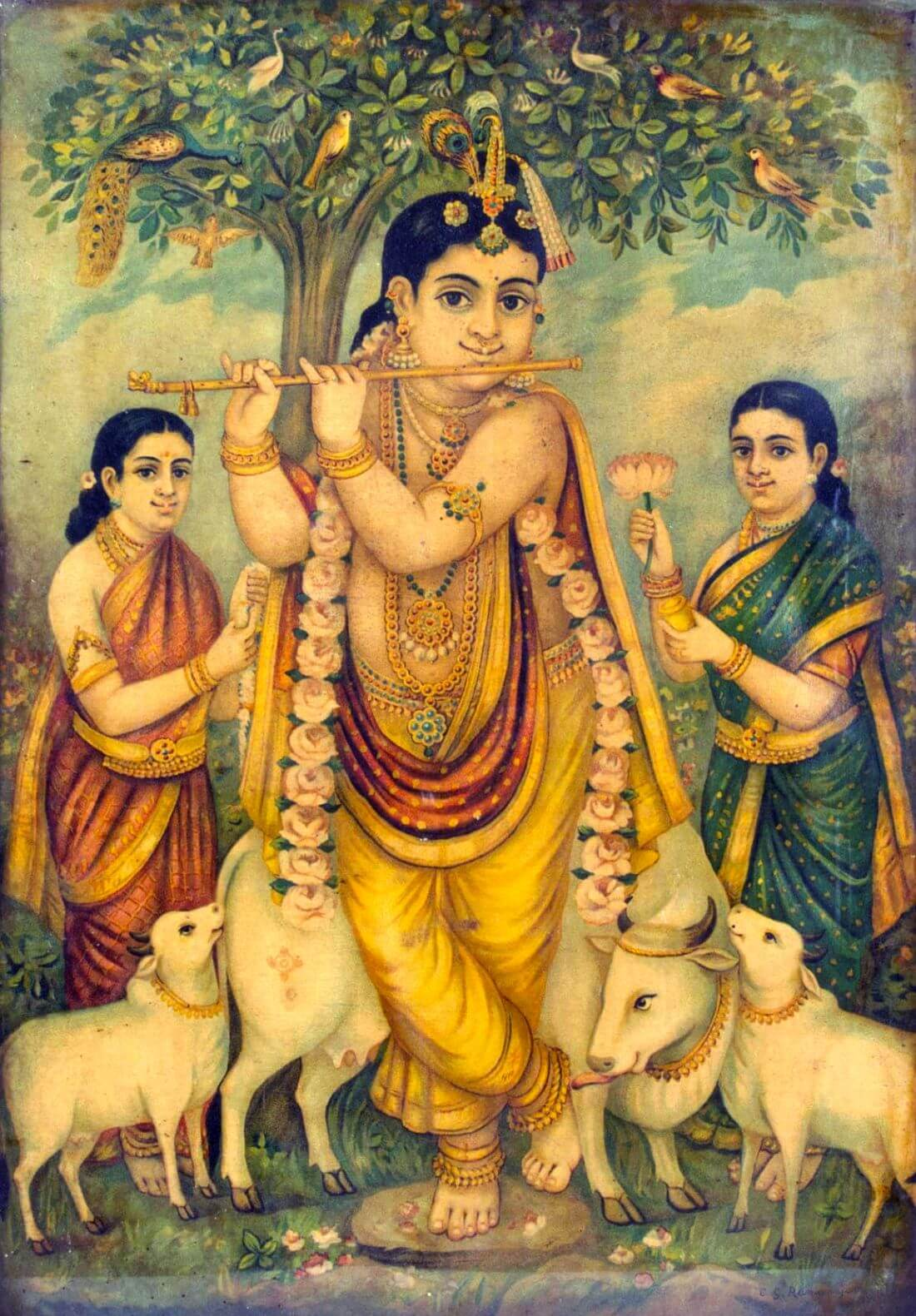
Krishna depicted with cows, Ravi Varma Press.

Govatsa Dwadashi is a Hindu cultural and religious festival which marks the beginning of Diwali celebrations in some parts of India, especially in the state of Maharashtra, where it is known as Vasu Baras. In Gujarat, it is celebrated as Vagh Baras and as Sripada Vallabha Aradhana Utsav of Sripada Sri Vallabha, at Pithapuram Datta Mahasamsthan in the state of Andhra Pradesh. In Hinduism, cows are regarded to be sacred animals for their capacity to nourish people with milk.

In some North Indian states, Govatsa Dwadashi is referred to as Vagh, which implies the repayment of one's financial debts. It is therefore a day when businessmen clear their accounting books and do not make further transactions in their new ledgers. Govatsa Dwadashi is also observed as Nandini Vrata, as both Nandini and Nandi are considered sacred in the Shaivite tradition. It is a thanksgiving festival to the cows for their help in sustaining human life, and thus both cows and calves are worshipped and fed with wheat products. The worshipers abstain from consuming any wheat and milk products on this day. It is believed that by these observances and worship, all wishes of the devotees will be fulfilled. The significance of Govatsa Dwadashi is stated in the Bhavishya Purana.

It is said that Govatsa Dwadashi was first observed with fasting by King Uttānapāda (the son of Svayambhuva Manu) and his wife Suniti. Because of their prayers and fast, they had a son named Dhruva.

== Rituals ==
Cows and calves are bathed, draped in clothes and flower garlands, and vermilion/turmeric powder is applied on their foreheads. In some villages, people make cows and calves out of mud, dressing them and adorning them as such, symbolically. Aartis are performed. Wheat products, gram and mung bean sprouts are then fed to the cows, symbolising the sacred cow Nandini, who was the daughter of Kamadhenu on earth, and lived in Sage Vasishtha's ashram. Devotees sing songs praising the love of Krishna for cows and being their benefactor. Women observe Nandini Vrata, a fast for the wellbeing of their children and abstain from drinking and eating. As cows are symbolic of motherhood and the chief source of livelihood in many villages in India, they are central to Diwali worship.

== See also ==
- Dwadashi
- Kamadhenu
- Sripada Sri Vallabha
- Karnataka Milk Federation
