= Krittika =

3rd lunar mansion of Hindu astrology

Map of Taurus showing Krittika (Pleiades)

Kṛttikā (Sanskrit: कृत्तिका, pronounced [kr̩ttɪkaː], popularly transliterated Krittika), sometimes known as Kārtikā, is the third of the 27 nakṣatras (lunar mansions) in Indian astronomy. It corresponds to the open star cluster called the Pleiades in Western astronomy; it is in the constellation Taurus. The name Kṛttikā literally translates to "the cutters".

It is also the name of its goddess-personification, who is a daughter of Daksha and Panchajani, and thus a half-sister to Khyati. Spouse of Kṛttikā is Chandra ("moon").

Alternative accounts suggest that Kritika was the name of six celestial women. The six Krittikas who raised the Hindu God Kartikeya are Śiva, Sambhūti, Prīti, Sannati, Anasūya and Kṣamā.

In Hindu astrology (Jyotiṣa), Kṛttikā is ruled by the Sun. Under the traditional Hindu principle of naming individuals according to their Ascendant/Lagna nakṣatra, the following Sanskrit syllables correspond with this nakṣatra, and would belong at the beginning of the first name of an individual born under it: A (अ), I (ई), U (उ) and E (ए).

== Cultural and mythological significance ==
In Vedic literature and Hindu mythology, the Krittika are known as the six mothers or nursemaids of the war god Kartikeya (also known as Skanda or Murugan), who was nurtured by them after being born from the sparks of Shiva’s third eye. The Krittika are identified with the Pleiades star cluster, and their names are often listed as Śiva, Sambhūti, Prīti, Sannati, Anasūya, and Kṣamā in various texts. They are revered as embodiments of maternal care and protective fierceness. In the Rigveda and later scriptures, the Krittika are associated with fire rituals (Agnihotra) and purification rites, symbolizing the transformative power of heat and flame. The lunar mansion of Krittika was also significant in Vedic astronomy as the original starting point of the zodiac in some ancient systems.

== Krittika Nakshatra in Tamil Vedic Astrology ==
In Tamil Vedic Astrology, Krittika Nakshatra is also known as Karthigai Nakshatra. It is the third nakshatra out of the 27 lunar nakshatras. The zodiac placement of this nakshatra falls on Aries (Mesha) and Taurus (Vrishabha). Krittika Nakshatra first quarter (pada) is in Aries (Mesha). The next three quarters (pada) are in Taurus (Vrishabha). The Ruling Planet of this Nakshatra is Sun (Surya). The Presiding Deity is Agni (God of Fire) and Lord Muruga (Kartikeya). The lucky colour for Krittika Nakshatra that falls in Aries (Mesha) is Red and Orange. The lucky colour for Krittika Nakshatra that falls in Taurus (Vrishabha) are White and Silver.

== See also ==
- List of Nakshatras
- Pleione
