= List of festivals in India =

This is a partial listing of festivals in India.

== Related lists ==
=== By type ===
- List of literary festivals in India
- List of Indian classical music festivals

=== By region ===
- List of festivals of West Bengal
  - Festivals in Kolkata
- List of fairs and festivals in Punjab
- List of festivals in Maharashtra
- List of festivals of Odisha
- Fairs and Festivals in Manipur
- category:Festivals in Tamil Nadu

=== By culture/religion ===
- List of Hindu festivals
  - List of Hindu festivals in Punjab
- List of festivals in Maharashtra
- List of Sikh festivals
- List of Sindhi festivals

== A ==
- Akshaya Tritiya
- Army Day
- Ananta Chaturdashi
- Ayudha Puja
- Arbaeen
- Ahoi Ashtami

== B ==
- Bandna Parab
- Bhai Dooj
- Buddha Purnima
- Bihu
- Baisakhi

== C ==
- Carnival
- Children's Day
- Christmas Day
- Cheti Chand
- Chhath Puja

== D ==
- Diwali (Jainism)
- Dhammachakra Pravartan Day
- Durga Puja
- Diwali
- Dwijing Festival

== E ==
- Engineer's Day
- Eid al-Fitr
- Eid al-Adha
- Vaikuntha Ekadashi
- Easter Sunday
- Elephant Festival

== G ==
- Gandhi Jayanti
- Ganesh Chathurthi
- Good Friday
- Guru Purnima
- Guru Nanak Jayanti
- Gurupurab

== H ==
- Hanuman Jayanti
- Hindi Diwas
- Holi
- Holla Mohalla
- Hornbill Festival
- Haldi Kumkum
- Hazrat Ali's Birthday
- Hanukkah

== I ==
- Independence Day

== J ==
- Janamashtami
- Jitiya
- Jivitputrika

== K ==
- Karam
- Kartik Purnima
- Karva Chauth
- Kumbh Mela
- Kojagiri Poornima
- Krishna Janmashtami
- Kerala School Kalolsavam
- Karnataka Rajyotsava

== L ==
- Lohri

== M ==
- Mahavir Janma Kalyanak
- Mahamastakabhisheka
- Maharashtra Day
- Mahashivratri
- Makar Sankranti
- Manusmriti Dahan Din
- Monti Fest
- Muharram (Ashura)

== N ==
- Nariyal poornima or Coconut day
- Nuakhai
- Navaratri
- National Space Day
- National Sports Day
- New Year's Eve

== O ==
- Onam

== P ==
- Parakram Diwas
- Pana Sankranti
- Parents' Worship Day
- Paryushan
- Pitru Paksha
- Pongal
- Pusnâ
- Pola
- Padwa (Diwali)
- Pateti
- Puri Rath Yatra

== R ==
- Ratha Yatra
- Raksha Bandhan
- Rama Navami
- Ramadan (Roza)
- Rashtriya Ekta Diwas
- Ratha Saptami
- Indian Republic day
- Radha Ashtami

== T ==
- Tamil New Year
- Teacher's Day
- Tulasi Vivaha
- Tulsi Pujan Diwas
- Tusu Parab
- Thaipusam

== U ==
- Ugadi

== V ==
- Van Mahotsav (Forest Day)
- Vasant Panchami
- Vishvakarma Puja
- Vishu
- Vivaha Panchami
