= List of Hindu festivals in Maharashtra =

Hindu Marathi people celebrate several festivals during the year. These include Gudi Padwa, Ram Navami, Hanuman Jayanti, Narali Pournimaon pournima, Mangala Gaur, Janmashtami, Ganesh Chaturthi, Kojagiri, Diwali, Khandoba Festival (Champa Shashthi), Makar Sankranti, Shivaratri, and Holi. Most villages in aharashtra also have a Jatra or Urus in honor of the village deity. On traditional festival people also makes traditional food that is puran poli and shrikhand. Other dishes include chapati and shrikhand and chapati, bhat and rassa etc.

== List ==
Festival name	Date - Hindu lunar calendar	Date - Gregorian calendar	Celebrating or Deity worshiped	Duration	Description
Gudi Padwa	1st day of Chaitra	March–April	New Year	One day	The year starts on the first day of Chaitra known as Gudi Padwa] which falls around March or April of the Western calendar. A gudi or victory pole is erected outside the house on this day. The special dish on the day includes Shreekhand. Neem leaves are eaten on this day to ward off illness during the new year. Gudi Padwa, like Diwali Padwa and Dasara, is considered one of the three and half auspicious days of the Marathi calendar. Astrological charts need not be consulted for conducting important ceremonies, such as weddings, on these days. During Chaitra, women also hold a Haladi-kunku celebration. Chaitra is, however, considered inauspicious for weddings.
Chaitragaur	3rd day of Chaitra to 3rd day of Vaishakh	March–May	New Year	One Month	.
Ram Navami	9th day of Chaitra	March–April	Rama	One day	Ram navami and Hanuman jayanti, the birthdays of Shree Ramchandra and Hanuman respectively are also celebrated in the month of Chaitra. Sunthawada/dinkawada, a snack usually eaten by new mothers is the snack of the day for Ram navami.
Hanuman Jayanti	15th day of Chaitra i.e. Chaitra Pournima	March–April	Hanuman	One day	Hanuman Jayanti, the birthday of Lord Hanuman is celebrated on this day. Boondi laddoo is favourite dish of lord Hanuman and is loved by many devotees. Boondi also gives sharp memory.
Vat Purnima	15th (Full Moon) day of Jyeshtha	May–June	Successful Marriage	One or Three Days	Vat Purnima, also called Vat Savitri Vrat is observed by married women. It involves women fasting and worship of a Banyan Tree by tying a ceremonial thread around it, praying for the longevity of the marriage. Legendary origins of the festival traces back to Savitri, who restored back her husband's life, snatching it away from Yama, the god of death.
Guru Purnima	Full moon day of Ashadh	July.	varied	One day	Teacher and gurus are honoured by their disciples on this day. GSB community offer Guru Seva at Shri Kavale Math.Chaturmas vrat Begins.
Narali Pournima	Full moon day of Shravan	July -August	Varied	One day	Male members of Hindu communities that have undergone the thread ceremony, change the sacred thread on this day. In northern India, this day is celebrated as Raksha bandhan. Marathi people in general have adopted the Raksha bandhan tradition of sisters tying a rakhee on the wrist of their brothers. A special sweetened rice with coconut, called Narali Bhat in Marathi, is the special dish of the day.Coastal communities worship the sea on this day and resume fishing.
Bail Pola	New moon day of Shravan	August	Thanksgiving to Oxen	One day	Primarily celebrated in rural areas, farmers acknowledge the Oxen and their crucial role in farming. The day is off the field for rest for the oxen, with they being decorated and presented with the sweet delicacy of Puran poli. Many villages organize processions and bull races.
Mangala Gaur	Any Tuesday in Shravan	August	Goddess Parvati	One day	Pahili Mangala Gaur (first Mangala Gaur) celebration is one of the most important celebration for the new brides. On the Tuesday of the month of Shravan after her marriage, the new bride performs Shivling puja for the well-being of her husband and new family. It is also a get-together of all women folks. It includes chatting, playing games, Ukhane (married women take their husband's name woven in 2/4 rhyming liners) and great food. They typically play Jhimma, Fugadi, Bhendya till the wee hours of the next morning
Janmashtami	Ashtami in the dark half of Shravan	August -September	Krishna	one day	Birthday of Lord Krishna on Shravan Vadya ashtami is observed with a fast. Gopalkala, a recipe made with curd (yoghurt), pickle, jondhale (popped millet), chilli, salt etc. is popular, especially amongst kids.
Ganesh Chaturthi	4th day of Bhaadrapada	August–September	Ganapati	1.5 to 10 days	Festival of Lord Ganesh. Through, Lokmanya Tilak's efforts Ganeshotsav became a public celebration a century ago. However, families install their own clay (called shadu in Marathi) Ganpati in their house on Ganesh Chaturthi for family observation of the festival. The private celebration can go on for 1½ days to full 10 days according to each family's tradition. A Modak (steamed rice dumpling usually with a jaggery/coconut filling) is a sweet prepared for this occasion, and is considered the favourite of Lord Ganesh. Ganeshotsav also incorporates the Gauri festival. people install statues of the Gauri. some people on the other hand use special rocks as symbols of Gauri. In some families Gauri is also known as Mahalakshmi puja. It is celebrated for three days; on the first day, Mahalakshmi arrival is observed. The ladies in the family will bring statues of Mahalakshmi from the door to the place where they will be worshipped. They are settled at a certain location (very near the Devaghar), adorned with clothes and ornaments. On the second day, the family members get together and prepare a meal of puran poli. This day is the puja day of Mahalakshmi and the meal is offered to Mahalakshmi and her blessings sought. On the third day, Mahalakshmi goes to her husband's home. Before the departure, ladies in the family will invite the neighbourhood ladies for exchange of haldi-kumkum. It is customary for the whole family to get together during the three days of Mahalakshmi puja. Most families consider Mahalakshmi as their daughter who is living with her husband's family all the year; but visits her parents' (maher) during the three days.
Navaratri	Chaitra and Ashvin	March–April and September–October	Durga	Nine nights, ten days	This festival starts on the first day of the Hindu month of Ashvin. The nine-day festival of Durga culminates in Vijayadashami (Dasara). This is one of the three auspicious days of the year. Traditionally, stars need not be consulted for starting a new project on this day. People also exchange leaves of Apti tree as symbol of gold. During Navaratri women and girls hold bhondla, a singing party in honour of the Goddess. Some families also observe Navaratri in spring season in addition to the Navaratri observed in winter.
Kojagiri Pournima	Ashvin	September–October	Laxmi	One night	on autumn Full Moon night is celebrated with sweetened milk. The first born in the family is also honoured on this night.
Diwali	Ashwin-Kartik	October–November	Varied	Five to Six	The festival of lights is celebrated over five days by people of Maharashtra. Families celebrate this by waking up early in the morning and having an oil bath. People light their houses with lamps, and burst fire crackers over the course of the festival. Special sweets and savouries like anarse, karanji, chakli, chivda (Bombay mix), ladoo are prepared for the festival. Colorful Rangoli are made in front of the house. Kids make a replica fort in memory of Shivaji, the great Maratha leader.
Khandoba Festival/Champa Shashthi	Margashirsh	December	Khandoba	Six	A six-day festival, from the first to sixth lunar day of the bright fortnight of the Hindu month of Margashirsh, in honour of Khandoba is celebrated by many deshastha families. Ghatasthapana, similar to navaratri, also takes place in Deshastha households during this festival. The sixth day is called Champa Sashthi.
Makar Sankranti	Varies	January 14 or 15	Varied	One day	This mostly falls on January 14 when the Sun enters Capricorn. In Maharashtra, the day is celebrated by giving and receiving sweets made of jaggery and sesame seeds called tilgool and halwa. During the exchanging of the sweets, people say to each other in Marathi "Til-gool Ghya aani God Bola" (rough translation Please accept my til-gool & be friendly to me or Take sweet, talk sweet"). Special chappati with jaggery (gool poli) is the dish of the day.
Maha Shivaratri	Magha trayodashi	January–February	Shiva	One day	Worship day of Lord Shiva. The Lord Shiva is pleased with austerities, so no sweets are prepared. A chutney made the fruit of Kawath tree (curd fruit, elephant apple, monkey fruit, or wood apple) is the speciality of this day.
Holi	Falgun Full moon	March	Holika	1–2 days	falls in Falgun, the last month of the marathi Shaka Calendar. Deshastha celebrate this festival by lighting a bonfire and offering puran poli to the fire. In North India, Holi is celebrated over two days with the second day celebrated with throwing colors. Maharashtrians celebrate color throwing five days after Holi on Ranga-Panchami.

== See also ==
- List of festivals
- Bholni pournima
