= Harald Tambs-Lyche =

Norweign anthropologist

- Born: 1946 (age 79–80)
- Occupation: Anthropologist
- Spouse: Marine Carrin

Academic background
- Education: Doctor of Philosophy
- Alma mater: University of Bergen
- Thesis: Power and Devotion: Religion and Society in Saurashtra (1992)

Academic work
- Discipline: Anthropology
- Sub-discipline: Ethnology; Social anthropology
- Institutions: Professor emeritus of ethnology at the University of Picardy Jules Verne
- Main interests: Caste system in India; Ethnicity; History of social stratification in India

Harald Tambs-Lyche (born 1946) is a Norwegian ethnologist and social anthropologist.

Tambs-Lyche earned a doctorate degree from the University of Bergen in 1992 with a doctoral thesis on the research subject of 'religion and society' in the Saurashtra region of India's Gujarat. He worked at the University of Bergen as a lecturer of social anthropology and retired as a professor of ethnology from the University of Picardy Jules Verne. His research interests includes the history of social stratification and the caste system in India.

== Family ==
Harald Tambs-Lyche is married to Marine Carrin. (Note: She is also an anthropologist.)

== Education and academic career ==
Tambs-Lyche did his master's in 1972 with the thesis titled "London Patidars" and his Ph.D. in 1992 with the thesis titled "Power and Devotion: Religion and Society in Saurashtra" — both from Norway's University of Bergen — and worked at the university as a lecturer of social anthropology. He is a professor emeritus of ethnology at the University of Picardy Jules Verne in Amiens, France.

== Research ==
Between starting of the 1970s and August 1972, Tambs-Lyche conducted field research on the "life and actions" of Gujarati Patidars living in London who had moved in Britain in the 1960s. He did anatomization of the Patidar's "mercantile ideology" and proffered that it distinguishes these immigrants from the British people and "constitutes the major element in the construction of an ethnic boundary". Fredrik Barth's view on the ethnic groups and boundaries and Barth's "idea of 'choice' and of seeing the 'rules' of society as generative, rather than as static and fixed" significantly shaped his study, though in his study, he went over the "idea of constraint" in larger depths than Barth. Marcus Banks suggests that Tambs-Lyche, along with Sandra Wallman, is amongst the few scholars who have comprehensively worked on the research ideas of Barth. He participated as an associate fellow in the project "History and Theory of the Anthropology of India" which was convened by Peter Berger at the University of Groningen in the Netherlands. At the program, he studied "the implications of Barth’s theories of ethnicity for an urban and modern setting".

Saurashtra region in India

Tambs-Lyche developed interest in "history and theory of caste" and worked on the subject with a focus on Gujarat's Saurashtra region. He studied "the changing constellations of caste" in the region with regard to the period from 800 CE to the British Raj and in the present-day society "from an interactional point of view". He did research on the goddess cult and Swaminarayan sect in Gujarat and highlighted the socioeconomic changes in the Gujarati society, which according to him, were responsible for the rise in prominence of vegetarian male deities at the expense of the goddess who was associated with "blood and meat". Farhana Ibrahim do not agree with his argument that the increasing tendency towards vegetarianism contributed to the decrease in goddess worship in Gujarat. She reasons that this argument "fails to take into account the fact, that the goddess herself can undergo a transformation" and be "made vegetarian". She gives an example of the goddess Ashapura who became "vegetarian and non-violent" and is worshipped in Gujarat's Kachchh region. Ibrahim notes that Ashapura has, however, "lost her status within the earlier context, where she was the guardian goddess of an independent Kachchh".

He studied "the relations caste identity entertains to ethnicity and class in a situation where all three are salient" in a study on Karnataka's Gaud Saraswat Brahmins. His research on caste highlighted the significance of "conflict, competition and power relations", but because of the influence of Louis Dumont and McKim Marriott on him, also placed emphasis on "the presence of a hierarchizing mode of interaction and discourse".

Tambs-Lyche and Carrin also studied the work of the Scandinavian Christian missionaries among the Santals at the Santhal Parganas in India.

== Written work ==
=== Power, Profit, and Poetry (2000) ===
Tambs-Lyche's Power, Profit, and Poetry: Traditional Society in Kathiawar, Western India is a study of the social changes that took place in Gujarat's Kathiawar (in the Saurashtra region) from the early medieval period to the turn of the 19th century. In the book, Tambs-Lyche provided a study of the changing relationship between three groups in the region — the kings and their agricultural, Brahmin, pastoral and Rajput supporters; the merchants; and the Charans — with the three of them representing power, profit, and poetry, respectively. Assessing Tambs-Lyche's work, Mahesh Neelkanth Buch stated that he explored the subject matter from three angles — anthropological, socio–political, and historical — with an infusion of myth and legend. Buch suggested that though these attributes made his work a scholarly study, he could not do full justice to it by constricting the whole study in only one volume, which, in the opinion of Buch, should have been presented in "several volumes".

=== An Encounter of Peripheries (2008) ===
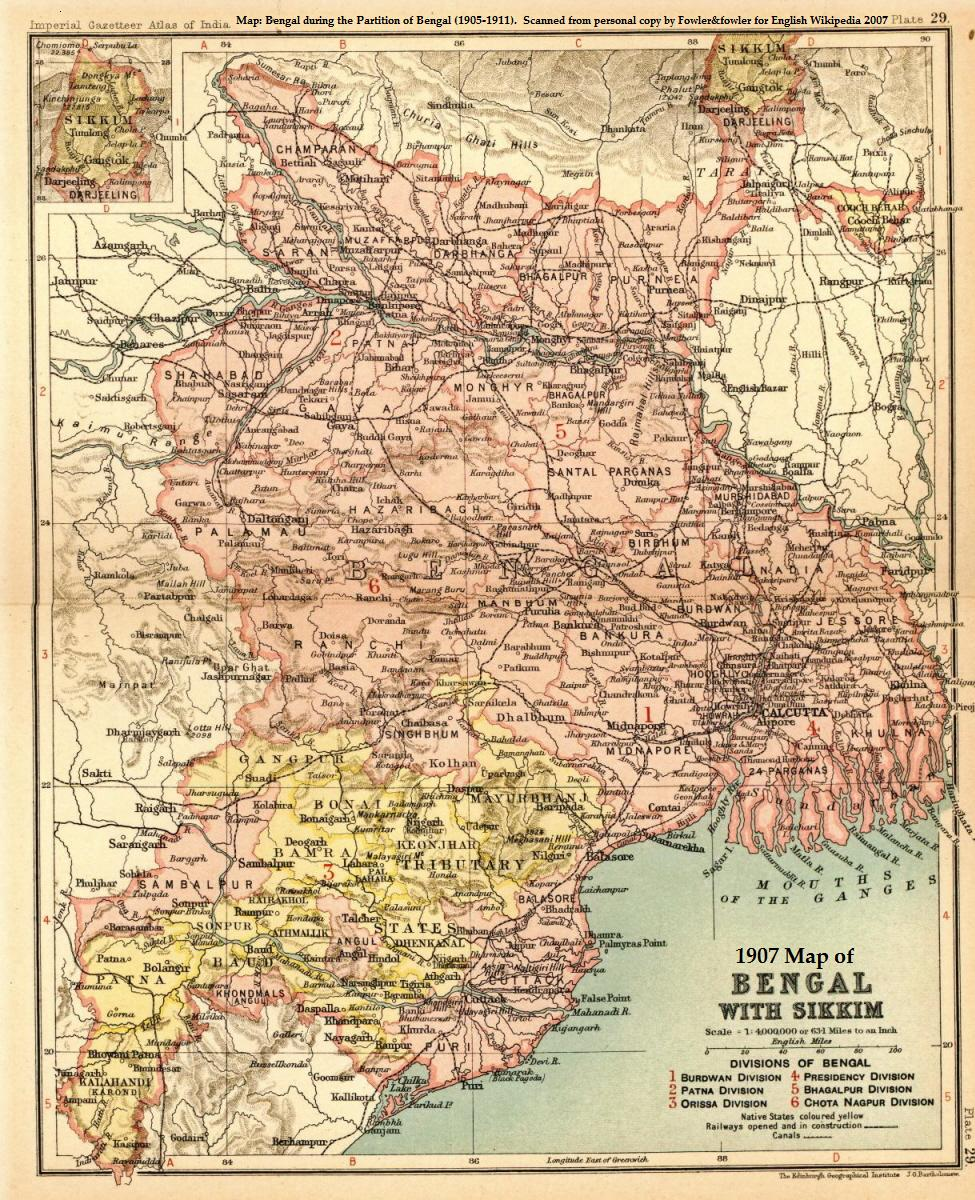
The Santal Parganas in a 1907 map of the Bengal area

An Encounter of Peripheries: Santals, Missionaries, and Their Changing Worlds, 1867–1900, coauthored by Tambs-Lyche and Carrin, is a monographic study of the work of two Scandinavian missionaries–turned–evangelists — Hans Peter Borresen from Denmark and Lara Olaf Skrefsrud from Norway — among the Santals living in India's eastern region at a time when the region was "beyond the direct control of British India". The authors located the two "within the broader transformations in northern Europe, the Victorian empire in India, colonial Bengal and the Santal communities in the aftermath of the suppressed rising (Hul) of 1855–56". The monograph argued that the variations in the Victorian evangelism was one of the root causes of the "failure of the Scandinavians to sustain their communitarian vision of a Santal utopia, ruled by puritan values of industry and prosperity".

Jadavpur University's Suchetana Chattopadhyay stated that though the book provided "empirical insights" in the less explored universe of Scandinavian Christian missionaries and the part they played in structuring Santal agency from the 1860s till the end of the 19th century, in their study, the ethnographic material was given precedence over the historical material by the authors. Chattopadhyay is of the view that, in the monograph, "the ethnographic segments resemble interpolations and do not blend with the historical narratives".

The authors drew praise from Butler University's Chad Bauman for shedding light on the similarities between the Santals and the first Christian missionaries (who worked among the Santals) of the Scandinavian 'Indian Home Mission' (IHM) that was established in 1868 CE. In the opinion of Bauman, there are three problems with the monograph — firstly, the missionaries of the IHM were neither British nor colonialists and scholars agree that the "missionary values and ambitions were often at odds with those of the [British] empire" but a study of their relationship with the British colonialists suggests that they "were a significant part of imperial agency", however, the authors maintained that they "were part of colonial dynamics, but not of the colonial project"; secondly, "it is inordinately focused on the European side of this ostensible encounter"; thirdly, the text has "organizational problems" which leads to "a loss of chronological clarity". Bauman, however, suggested the monograph provides access to the ethnographic and historical material from the IHM archives which numerous researchers might have missed due to "linguistic issues".

=== Transaction and Hierarchy (2017) ===
Tambs-Lyche's Transaction and Hierarchy: Elements for a Theory of Caste is a study of the Indian society and its caste system from historical and sociological perspectives.

Tambs-Lyche reflected on the previous studies on caste by Adrian C. Mayer, Andre Beteille, Frederick George Bailey, Fredrik Barth, Gerald Berreman, Govind Sadashiv Ghurye, Louis Dumont, McKim Marriott, and Mysore Narasimhachar Srinivas. He praised Dumont for his "effort to formulate a sociological as well as cultural theory of the castes" and criticized him "for having generalized a Brahmano-centric model of the caste system". University of Lausanne's Raphaël Rousseleau noted that Tambs-Lyche initially "[distinguished] various forms of kingship" in northern and southern India from the medieval and modern period by drawing on the approach of Burton Stein, and later introduced his personal "historical schematization" as well. Rousseleau also noted that he drew from the works of Chris J. Fuller, Lawrence A. Babb, Susan Snow Wadley, and Gérard Toffin and Véronique Bouillier to "[demonstrate] the contextual and fluid nature of divine classifications" to emphasize "the importance of transactions in the processes of hierarchization of gods and men", thereby making the argument that "rituals and festivals reflect less an underlying harmonious order than they express strategic attempts to create an Integration through Ritual".

== Works ==
=== Books ===
- Tambs-Lyche, Harald (2017). Transaction and Hierarchy: Elements for a Theory of Caste. London, UK: Routledge. ISBN 978-1351393966. LCCN 2016362561. OCLC 993949230.
- Tambs-Lyche, Harald (2011). Business Brahmins: The Gauda Saraswat Brahmins of South Kanara (illustrated ed.). New Delhi, India: Manohar. ISBN 978-8173049026. LCCN 2011311897. OCLC 755004375.
- Tambs-Lyche, Harald; Carrin, Marine (2008). An Encounter of Peripheries: Santals, Missionaries, and Their Changing Worlds, 1867–1900. New Delhi, India: Manohar. ISBN 978-8173047558. LCCN 2008306403. OCLC 1131583460.
- Tambs-Lyche, Harald (2004). The Good Country: Individual, Situation, and Society in Saurashtra (illustrated ed.). New Delhi, India: Manohar. ISBN 978-8173044175. LCCN 2004307843. OCLC 1129582901.
- Tambs-Lyche, Harald (1997). Power, Profit, and Poetry: Traditional Society in Kathiawar, Western India. New Delhi, India: Manohar. ISBN 978-8173041761. LCCN 97900971. OCLC 36884049.
- Tambs-Lyche, Harald (1980). London Patidars: A Case Study in Urban Ethnicity (illustrated ed.). Boston, USA; London, UK: Routledge & Kegan Paul. ISBN 978-0710084712. LCCN 80040636. OCLC 1049767731.

=== Selected papers ===
- Tambs-Lyche, Harald (2021). "Hindu Pastoralists of Western India". In Carrin, Marine; Boivin, Michel; Toffin, Gérard; Hockings, Paul; et al. (eds.). Brill's Encyclopedia of the Religions of the Indigenous People of South Asia Online. Brill. doi:10.1163/2665-9093_BERO_COM_032234. ISBN 978-9004355521.
- Tambs-Lyche, Harald (2018). "Historicity, Subalternity and Caste". Rivista Degli Studi Orientali. 91 (2). Rome, Italy: Sapienza University of Rome. eISSN 1724-1863. ISSN 0392-4866.
- Tambs-Lyche, Harald (2016). "Domination by Hegemony, or Force Countered by Resistance? The Indian Caste Order between Scott and Gramsci" (PDF). Irish Journal of Anthropology. 19 (2). Kildare, Ireland: Anthropological Association of Ireland: 14–30. ISSN 1393-8592.
- Tambs-Lyche, Harald (2014). "Ethnic Groups and Boundaries: Nordic Schools of Approach". Roskilde, Denmark: Roskilde University. pp. 51–73 – via Open Journal Systems.
- Tambs-Lyche, Harald; Carrin, Marine (2003). "'You Don't Joke With These Fellows.' Power and Ritual in South Canara, India" (PDF). Social Anthropology. 11 (1). Wiley-Blackwell: 23–42. doi:10.1017/S0964028203000028 (inactive 30 October 2025).
- Tambs-Lyche, Harald (1975). "A Comparison of Gujarati Communities in London and the Midlands". Journal of Ethnic and Migration Studies. 4 (3). Taylor & Francis: 349–355. doi:10.1080/1369183X.1975.9975385.

== See also ==
- Dirk H. A. Kolff
