= Padwa (disambiguation) =

Padwa is a village in India.

Padwa may also refer to:

== People with the surname ==
- Chanoch Dov Padwa (1908–2000), Orthodox Jewish posek and rabbinic leader
- Imanuel Permenas Padwa (born 1984), Indonesian footballer
- Vladimir Padwa (1900–1981), American pianist, composer, and educator

== Other uses ==
- Gudi Padwa, a Hindu holy day
- Bali Pratipada/Diwali Padwa, the start of Hindu financial year, 1st day of the new month Kartik in the Hindu calendar

== See also ==
- Padua (disambiguation)
