= Veeramakaliamman Temple, Arantangi =

Veeramakaliamman Temple is situated at Arantangi in Pudukkottai district in Tamil Nadu, India.

== Location ==
It is located at a distance of 40 km from Pudukkottai, in Karaikkudi-Mayiladuthurai rail way at a distance of 45 km.

== Structure ==
In front of the temple shrines of vinayaka and Karuppar are found. This temple has Vasantha mandapa and maha mandapa. The presiding deity is found in the sanctum sanctorum in sitting posture. She is having among others sula, lotus flower, damaru, shield and kapala.

== Presiding deity ==
The presiding deity is known as Veeramakaliamman. In earlier days she was worshipped at a place called Surakkudi near Karaikkudi and later she was started worshipping in this place, which is located at a distance of 2 km from Arantangi. During Vanavasa, the halt at the forest, Pandavas came to this place, which was known as Veeravanam then, and worshipped the deity. The goddess showed them a place for their halt.

== Worshipping time ==
Pujas are held four times daily at Kalasanthi (8.00 a.m.), Uttchikkalam (noon 12.00), Sayaratchai (6.00 p.m.) and Arthajamam (8.00 p.m.). The temple is opened for worship from 6.00 a.m. to 12.30 p.m. and from 4.00 p.m. to 8.30 p.m. During the Tamil month of Adi, festival is held in a grand manner. During the Tamil month of Chittirai, the first day of the month, Vaikasi Visakam, Aadi Perukku, Avani Avittam, Navaratri, Deevapali, Karthikai, Vaikuntha Ekadashi, the first day of Tamil month of Tamil month of Thai, and Sivaratri are held here.
