= San Antonio de Padua (disambiguation) =

San Antonio de Padua is a city in Greater Buenos Aires, Argentina. It is named after Anthony of Padua, a Roman Catholic saint. The name may also refer to:

- San Antonio de Padua de la Concordia, or just "Concordia", a city in Entre Rios Province, Argentina
- San Antonio de Padua, Antioquia, a village in Colombia
- Club Atlético San Antonio de Padua, an Argentinian sports club

== Churches ==
- San Antonio de Padua, Aranjuez in Madrid, Spain
- San Antonio de Padua, Avilés in Avilés, Spain
- San Antonio de Padua Church in Pecos, New Mexico
- San Antonio de Padua Church, or the "Pila Church", in Laguna, Philippines
- San Antonio de Padua del Quemado Chapel in Cordova, New Mexico
- San Antonio de Padua Parish Church in Camarines Sur, Philippines
- Iglesia de San Antonio de Padua in Puerto Rico
- Mission San Antonio de Padua in California
- Parroquia San Antonio de Padua in Costa Rica

== See also ==
- Hermitage of San Antonio de Padua de la Tuna, an archaeological site in Isabela, Puerto Rico
- Saint Anthony of Padua, a bus company operating in Cavite and Metro Manila, Philippines
- St. Anthony of Padua Church (disambiguation)
- Padua (disambiguation)
