= Raksha Bandhan =

Hindu annual rite

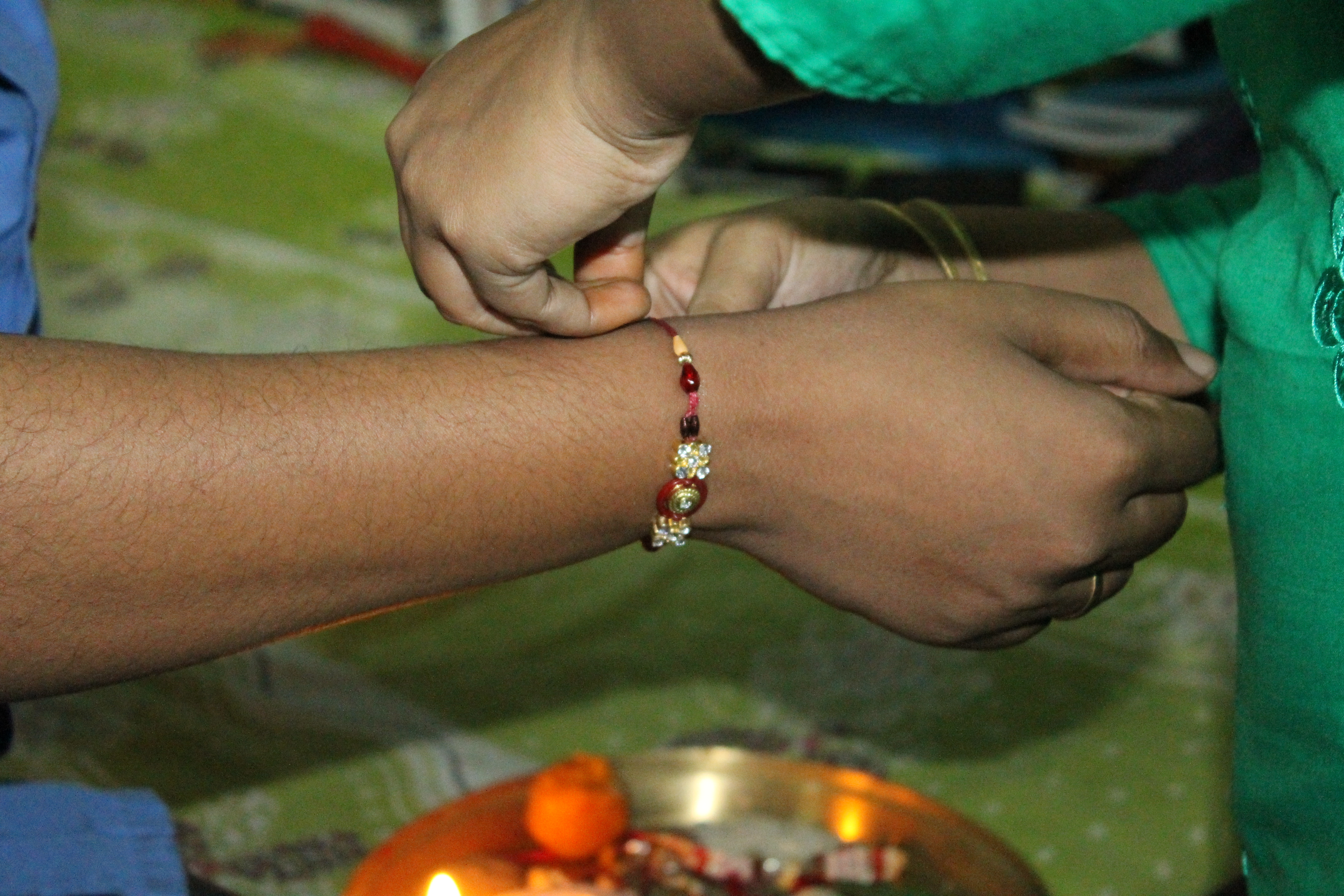
- A rakhi being tied during Raksha Bandhan
- Official name: Raksha Bandhan
- Also called: Rakhi, Saluno, Silono, Rakri.
- Observed by: Hindus
- Type: Religious, cultural
- Significance: Honours the bond between siblings
- Date: Shukla Purnima (full moon) of Shravana
- 2025 date: 9 August (Saturday)
- 2026 date: 28 August (Friday)
- Related to: Bhai Duj, Bhai Tika, Sama Chakeva

"Mayer's (1960: 219) observation for central India would not be inaccurate for most communities in the subcontinent:

A man's tie with his sister is accounted very close. The two have grown up together, at an age when there is no distinction made between the sexes. And later, when the sister marries, the brother is seen as her main protector, for when her father has died to whom else can she turn if there is trouble in her conjugal household.

The parental home, and after the parents' death the brother's home, often offers the only possibility of temporary or longer-term support in case of divorce, desertion, and even widowhood, especially for a woman without adult sons. Her dependence on this support is directly related to economic and social vulnerability."

— Bina Agarwal in A Field of One's Own: Gender and Land Rights in South Asia (1994), quoting Adrian C. Mayer, Caste and kinship in Central India (1960)

Raksha Bandhan is a popular and traditionally Hindu annual rite or ceremony that is central to a festival of the same name celebrated in South Asia, and among people around the world influenced by Hindu culture. On this day, sisters of all ages tie a talisman or amulet, called the rakhi, around the wrists of their brothers. The sisters symbolically protect the brothers, receive a gift in return, and traditionally invest the brothers with a share of the responsibility of their potential care.

Raksha Bandhan is observed on the last day of the Hindu lunar calendar month of Shravana, which typically falls in August. The expression "Raksha Bandhan" (literally, Sanskrit for "the bond of protection, obligation, or care") is now principally applied to this ritual. Until the mid-20th century, the expression was more commonly applied to a similar ritual, held on the same day, with precedence in ancient Hindu texts. In that ritual, a domestic priest ties amulets, charms, or threads on the wrists of his patrons, or changes their sacred thread, and receives gifts of money. This is still the case in some places. By contrast, the sister-brother festival, with origins in folk culture, had names which varied with location. Some were rendered as saluno, silono, and rakri. A ritual associated with saluno included the sisters placing shoots of barley behind the ears of their brothers.

Of special significance to married women, Raksha Bandhan is rooted in the practice of territorial or village exogamy. The bride marries out of her natal village or town, and her parents by custom do not visit her in her married home. In rural north India, large numbers of married Hindu women travel back to their parents' homes every year for the ceremony. The brothers also travel to their sisters' married home to escort them back. Many younger married women arrive a few weeks earlier at their natal homes and stay until the ceremony. The brothers serve as lifelong intermediaries between their sisters' married and parental homes, as well as potential stewards of their security.

In urban India, where families are increasingly nuclear, the festival has become more symbolic but continues to be highly popular. The rituals associated with this festival have spread beyond their traditional regions and have been transformed through technology and migration. Other factors that have played a role are: the movies, social interaction, and promotion by politicized Hinduism, as well as by the nation state. Among females and males who are not blood relatives, the act of tying the rakhi amulets has given rise to the tradition of voluntary kin relations, which has sometimes cut across lines of caste, class, and religion. Authority figures have been included in such a ceremony.

== Etymology, meaning, and usage ==
According to the Oxford English Dictionary, Third Edition, 2008, the Hindi word, rākhī derives from the Sanskrit rakṣikā, a join: rakṣā protection, amulet ( < rakṣ- to protect + -ikā, diminutive suffix.)

- 1829 The first attested use in the English language dates to 1829, in James Tod's, Ann. & Antiq. Rajasthan I. p. 312, "The festival of the bracelet (Rakhi) is in Spring ... The Rajpoot dame bestows with the Rakhi the title of adopted brother; and while its acceptance secures to her all the protection of a 'cavaliere servente', scandal itself never suggests any other tie to his devotion."
- 1857, Forbes: Dictionary of Hindustani and English Saluno: the full moon in Sawan at which time the ornament called rakhi is tied around the wrist.
- 1884, Platts: Dictionary of Urdu, Classical Hindi, and English راکهي राखी rākhī (p. 582) H راکهي राखी rākhī [S. रक्षिका], s.f. A piece of thread or silk bound round the wrist on the festival of Salūno or the full moon of Sāvan, either as an amulet and preservative against misfortune, or as a symbol of mutual dependence, or as a mark of respect; the festival on which such a thread is tied—rākhī-bandhan, s.f. The festival called rākhī.
  - 1899 Monier-Williams: A Sanskrit–English dictionary Rakshā: "a sort of bracelet or amulet, any mysterious token used as a charm, ... a piece of thread or silk bound round the wrist on partic occasions (esp. on the full moon of Śrāvaņa, either as an amulet and preservative against misfortune, or as a symbol of mutual dependence, or as a mark of respect".
  - 1990, Jack Goody: "The ceremony itself involves the visit of women to their brothers ... on a specific day of the year when they tie a gaudy decoration on the right wrists of their brothers, which is at once "a defence against misfortune, a symbol of dependence, and a mark of respect."
- 1965–1975, Hindi Sabd Sagara "राखी १— संज्ञा स्त्री० [सं० रक्षा] वह मंगलसूत्र जो कुछ विशिष्ट अवसरों पर, विशेपतः श्रावणी पूर्णिमा के दिन ब्राह्मण या और लोग अपने यजमानों अथवा आत्मीयों के दाहिने हाथ की कलाई पर बाँधते हैं। (That Mangalsutra (lucky or auspicious thread) which on special occasions, especially the full moon day of the month of Shravani, Brahmins or others tie around the right wrist of their patrons or intimates.) .
- 1976, Adarsh Hindi Shabdkosh रक्षा (संज्ञा स्त्रीलिंग): कष्ट, नाश, या आपत्ति से अनिष्ट निवारण के लिए हाथ में बंधा हुआ एक सूत्र; -बंधन (पुलिंग) श्रावण शुक्ला पूर्णिमा को होनेवाला हिंदुओं का एक त्यौहार जिसमे हाथ की कलाई पर एक रक्षा सूत्र बाँधा जाता है. (transl. raksha (feminine noun): A thread worn around the wrist for the prevention of distress, destruction, tribulation, or misfortune; -bandhan (masculine): "a Hindu festival held on the day of the full moon in the month of Shravana in which a raksha thread is tied around the wrist.)
- 1993, Oxford Hindi–English Dictionary रक्षा बंधन: m. Hindi, the festival of Rakshabandhan held on the full moon of the month of Savan, when sisters tie a talisman (rakhi q.v.) on the arms of their brothers and receive small gifts of money from them.
- 2000, Samsad Bengali–English Dictionary রাখি rākhi: a piece of thread which one ties round the wrist of another in order to safeguard the latter from all evils. ̃পূর্ণিমা n. the full moon day of the month of Shravan (শ্রাবণ) when a rakhi is tied round the wrist of another. ̃বন্ধন n. act or the festival of tying a rakhi (রাখি) round the wrist of another.
- 2013, Oxford Urdu–English Dictionary راکھے ra:khi: 1. (Hinduism) (i) rakhi, bracelet of red or yellow strings tied by a woman round the wrist of a man on a Hindu festival to set up brotherly relations. بندھن- – bandhan: festival of rakhi.

== Traditional regions of observance ==
Scholars who have written about the ritual have usually described the traditional region of its observance as north India; however, also included are central India, western India and Nepal, as well as other regions of India and overseas Hindu communities such as Fiji. It is essentially a Hindu festival; however, in addition to India and Nepal, Pakistan and Mauritius are two other countries where Hindus celebrate this occasion. Anthropologist Jack Goody, whose field study was conducted in Nandol, in Gujarat, describes Rakshabandhan as an "annual ceremony ... of northern and western India". Anthropologist Michael Jackson writes, "While traditional North Indian families do not have a Father's or Mother's Day, or even the equivalent of Valentine's Day, there is a Sister's Day, called Raksha Bandhan, ..." Religious scholar J. Gordon Melton describes it as "primarily a North Indian festival". Leona M. Anderson and Pamela D. Young describe it as "one of the most popular festivals of North India". Anthropologist David G. Mandelbaum has described it as "an annual rite observed in northern and western India". Other descriptions of primary regions are of development economist Bina Agarwal ("In Northern India and Nepal this is ritualized in festivals such as raksha-bandhan."), scholar and activist Ruth Vanita ("a festival widely celebrated in north India."), anthropologist James D. Faubion ("In north India this brother-sister relationship is formalized in the ceremony of 'Rakshabandhan.'"), and social scientist Prem Chowdhry ("... in the noticeable revival of the Raksha Bandhan festival and the renewed sanctity it has claimed in North India".).

== Evolution of Raksha Bandhan ==
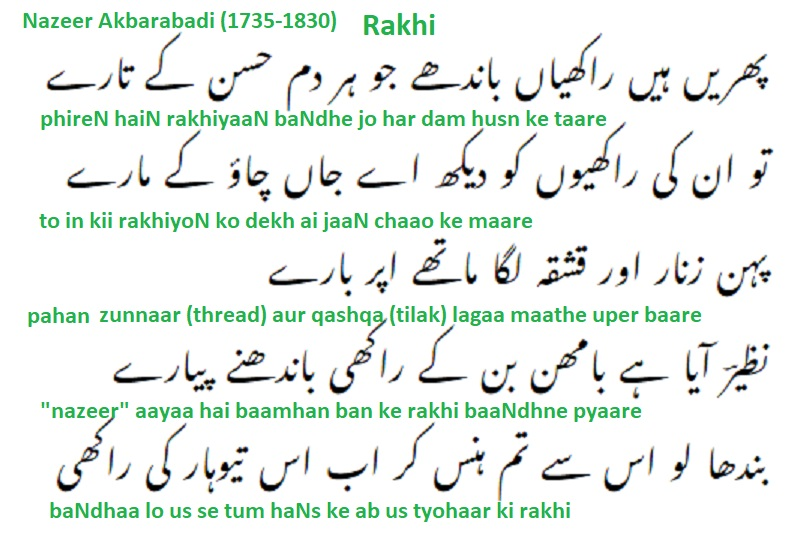
Nazeer Akbarabadi (1735–1830) wrote one of the first nazms (poems) in Hindustani on Rakhi. This is the last "band" (stanza); the poet fantasizes that he (a Muslim) would like to dress up as a "Bamhan" (Brahmin priest), with sacred thread and mark on forehead, so that he too can tie the threads on the wrists of all the beautiful people around him.

"August 26, '44 My dear Lachi-Raja, After all your letter has come, and I feel greatly relieved. ... The Raksha and Janeoo mentioned in your present communication of 17th which you had sent on the occasion of Rakshabandhan got stranded somewhere, and have not yet arrived. There is little chance of their being recovered now. "

From a letter written by Indian nationalist Govind Ballabh Pant, to his children Laxmi Pant (nickname Lachi) and K. C. Pant (Raja), from Ahmednagar Fort prison on 26 August 1944.

— Govind Ballabh Pant, from Selected Works of Govind Ballabh Pant, Oxford University Press, 1998.

Sociologist Yogendra Singh has noted the contribution of American anthropologist McKim Marriott to an understanding of the origins of the Raksha Bandhan festival. In rural society, according to Marriott, there is steady interplay between two cultural traditions, the elite or "great" tradition based in texts, such as the Vedas in Indian society, and the local or "little", based in folk art and literature. According to Singh, Marriott has shown that the Raksha Bandhan festival has its "origin in the 'little tradition'". Anthropologist Onkar Prasad has further suggested that Marriott was the first to consider the limitations within which each village tradition "operates to retain its essence".

In his village study, Marriott described two concurrently observed traditions on the full moon day of Shravana: a "little tradition" festival called "Saluno", and a "great tradition" festival, Raksha Bandhan, but which Marriott calls, "Charm Tying":

On Saluno day, many husbands arrive at their wives' villages, ready to carry them off again to their villages of marriage. But, before going off with their husbands, the wives as well as their unmarried village sisters express their concern for and devotion to their brothers by placing young shoots of barley, the locally sacred grain, on the heads and ears of their brothers. (The brothers) reciprocate with small coins. On the same day, along with the ceremonies of Saluno, and according to the literary precedent of the Bhavisyottara Purana, ... the ceremonies of Charm Tying (Rakhi Bandhan or Raksha Bandhan) are also held. The Brahman domestic priests of Kishan Garhi go to each patron and tie upon his wrist a charm in the form of a polychrome thread, bearing tassel "plums." Each priest utters a vernacular blessing and is rewarded by his patron with cash, ... The ceremonies of both now exist side by side, as if they were two ends of a process of primary transformation.

Norwegian anthropologist Øyvind Jaer, who did his fieldwork in eastern Uttar Pradesh in the 1990s, noted that the "great tradition" festival was in retreat and the "little tradition" one, involving sisters and brothers, now more important.

== Precedence in Hindu texts ==
In chapter 137 of the Uttara Parva of the Bhavishya Purana, the Hindu god Krishna describes to Yudhishthira the ritual of having a raksha (protection) tied to his right wrist by the royal priest (the rajapurohita) on the purnima (full moon day) of the Hindu lunar calendar month of Shravana. In one passage, Krishna says,

"Partha (applied to any of the three sons of Kunti (also, Pritha), here with a particular empasis on Yudhishthira): When the sky is covered with clouds, and the earth dark with new, tender, grass, in that very Shravana month's full moon day, at the time of sunrise, according to remembered convention, a Brahmin should take a bath with perfectly pure water. He should also according to his ability, offer libations of water to the gods, to the paternal ancestors, as prescribed by the Vedas for the task required to be accomplished before the study of the Vedas, to the sages, and as directed by the gods carry out and bring to a satisfactory conclusion the shraddha ceremony to honor the deceased. It is commended that a Shudra should also make a charitable offering, and take a bath accompanied by the mantras. That very day, in the early afternoon (between noon and 3 PM) it is commended that a small parcel (bundle or packet) be prepared from a new cotton or silk cloth and adorned with whole grains of rice or barley, small mustard seeds, and red ocher powder, and made exceedingly wondrous, be placed in a suitable dish or receptacle. ... the purohita should bind this packet on the king's wrist with the words,'I am binding raksha (protection) to you with the same true words with which I bound Mahabali King of the Asuras. Always stay firm in resolve.' In the same manner as the king, after offering prayers to the Brahmins, the Brahmins, Kshatriyas, Vaishyas and Shudras should conclude their Raksha Bandhan ceremony."

== Relation to territorial exogamy ==
Of special significance to married women, Raksha Bandhan is rooted in the practice of territorial or village exogamy—in which a bride marries out of her natal village or town, and her parents, by custom, do not visit her in her married home. Anthropologist Leo Coleman writes:

Rakhi and its local performances in Kishan Garhi were part of a festival in which connections between out-marrying sisters and village-resident brothers were affirmed. In the "traditional" form of this rite, according to Marriott, sisters exchanged with their brothers to ensure their ability to have recourse—at a crisis, or during childbearing—to their natal village and their relatives there even after leaving for their husband's home. For their part, brothers engaging in these exchanges affirmed the otherwise hard-to-discern moral solidarity of the natal family, even after their sister's marriage.

In rural north India, where village exogamy is strongly prevalent, large numbers of married Hindu women travel back to their parents' homes every year for the ceremony. Scholar Linda Hess writes: Their brothers, who typically live with the parents or nearby, sometimes travel to their sisters' married home to escort them back. Many younger married women arrive a few weeks earlier at their natal homes and stay until the ceremony. Folklorist Susan Snow Wadley writes:

"In Savan, greenness abounds as the newly planted crops take root in the wet soil. It is a month of joy and gaiety, with swings hanging from tall trees. Girls and women swing high into the sky, singing their joy. The gaiety is all the more marked because women, especially the young ones, are expected to return to their natal homes for an annual visit during Savan.

The brothers serve as lifelong intermediaries between their sisters' married- and parental homes, as well as potential stewards of their security.

== Urbanization and mid-20th century transformations ==
Journal entries of a newly-married, English-speaking, urban Indian woman around the time of Raksha Bandhan, August 1951.
The Hindu lunar calendar dates are below the English ones.
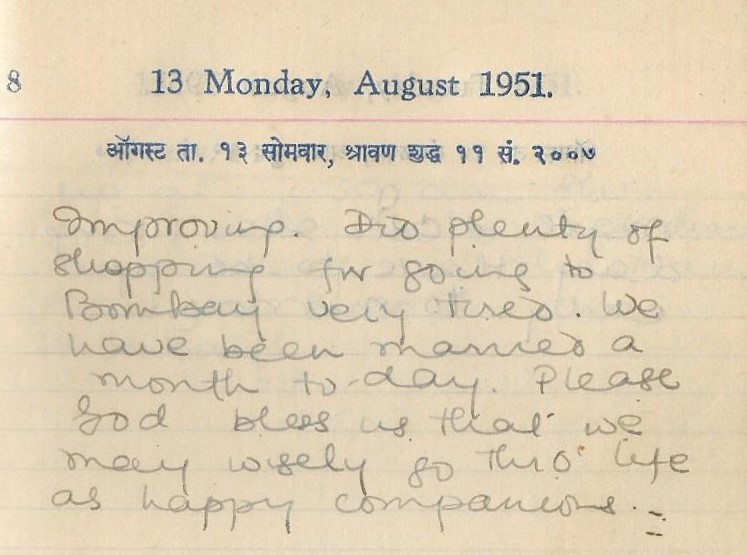
Shopping, 13 August 1951 (Shravana, 11th day, waxing moon). The Hindu lunar calendar dates are below the English ones.

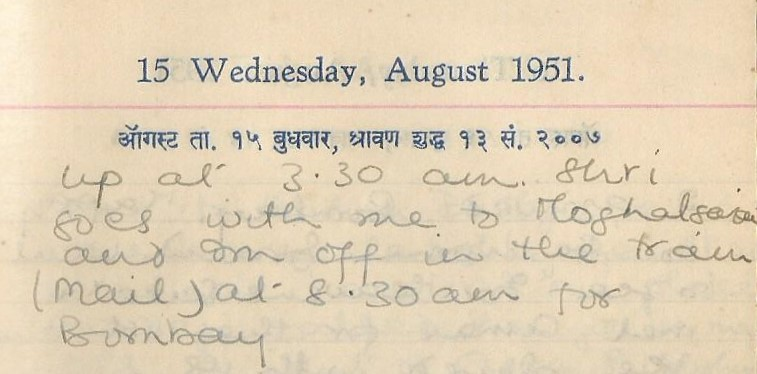
Boards train for natal home, 15 August 1951. (Shravana, 13th day waxing moon)

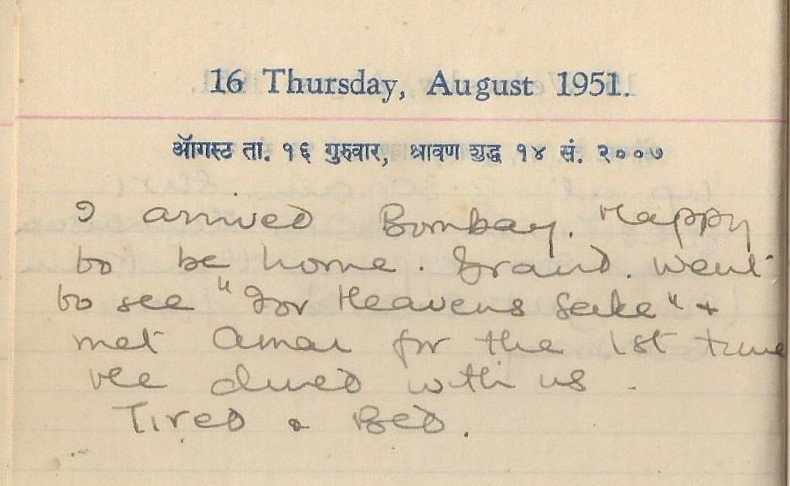
Arrives at natal home 16 August 1951. (Shravana 14th day, waxing moon.)

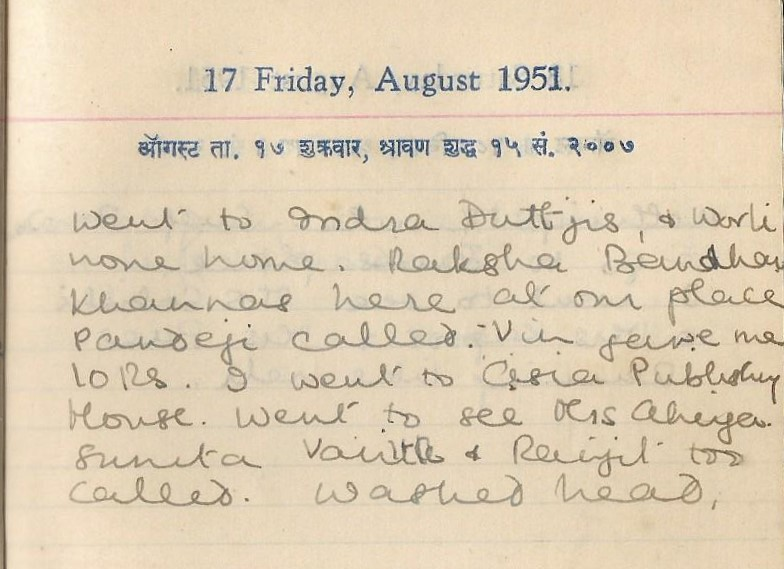
Raksha Bandhan, 17 August 1951. Receives Rupees 10 from her brother. (Shravana, last day, full moon.)

In his 1955 village study, anthropologist McKim Marriott noted transformations of ritual that had begun to take place:

A further, secondary transformation of the festival of Charm Tying is also beginning to be evident in Kishan Garhi, for the thread charms of the priests are now factory-made in more attractive form ... A few sisters in Kishan Garhi have taken to tying these ... charms of priestly type onto their brothers' wrists. The new string charms are also more convenient for mailing in letters to distant, city-dwelling brothers whom sisters cannot visit on the auspicious day. Beals reports, furthermore, that brothers in the electrified village of Namhalli near Bangalore tuned in to All India Radio in order to receive a time signal at the astrologically exact moment, and then tied such charms to their own wrists, with an accompaniment of broadcast Sanskrit mantras.

In urban India, where families are increasingly nuclear and marriages not always traditional, the festival has become more symbolic, but continues to be highly popular. The rituals associated with these rites, however, have spread beyond their traditional regions and have been transformed through technology and migration, According to anthropologist, Leo Coleman:

In modern rakhi, technologically mediated and performed with manufactured charms, migrating men are the medium by which the village women interact, vertically, with the cosmopolitan center—the site of radio broadcasts, and the source of technological goods and national solidarity.

Hindi movies have played a salient role. According to author Vaijayanti Pandit,

Raksha Bandhan traditionally celebrated in North India has acquired greater importance due to Hindi films. Lightweight and decorative rakhis, which are easy to post, are needed in large quantities by the market to cater to brothers and sisters living in different parts of the country or abroad.

More social interaction among India's population has played a role in the increased celebration of this festival. According to author Renuka Khandekar:

But since independence and the gradual opening up of Indian society, Raksha Bandhan as celebrated in North India has won the affection of many South Indian families. For this festival has the peculiar charm of renewing sibling bonds.

The festival has also been promoted by Hindu political organizations. According to authors P. M. Joshy and K. M. Seethi,

The RSS employs a cultural strategy to mobilise people through festivals. It observes six major festivals in a year. ... Till 20 years back, festivals like 'Raksha Bandhan' were unknown to South Indians. Through shakha's intense campaign, now they have become popular in the southern India. In colleges and schools tying `Rakhi'—the thread that is used in the 'Raksha Bandhan'—has become a fashion and this has been popularised by the RSS and ABVP cadres.

Similarly, according to author Christophe Jaffrelot,

This ceremony occurs in a cycle of six annual festivals which often coincides with those observed in Hindu society, and which Hedgewar inscribed in the ritual calendar of his movement: Varsha Pratipada (the Hindu new year), Shivajirajyarohonastava (the coronation of Shivaji), guru dakshina, Raksha Bandhan (a North Indian festival in which sisters tie ribbons round the wrists of their brothers to remind them of their duty as protectors, a ritual which the RSS has re-interpreted in such a way that the leader of the shakha ties a ribbon around the pole of the saffron flag, after which swayamsevaks carry out this ritual for one another as a mark of brotherhood)

Finally, the nation state in India has itself promoted this festival. as Leo Coleman states:

... as citizens become participants in the wider "new traditions" of the national state. Broadcast mantras become the emblems of a new level of state power and the means of the integration of villagers and city dwellers alike into a new community of citizens.

More recently, after enactment of more gender-neutral inheritance laws in India, it has been suggested that in some communities the festival has seen a resurgence of celebration, which is serving to indirectly pressure women to abstain from fully claiming their inheritance. According to author Prem Chowdhry,

Rural patriarchal forces have been anxiously devising means to stem the progressive fallout of this Act through a variety of means. One way has been to oppose the inheritance rights of a daughter or a sister to those of the brother. Except in cases where there are no brothers, the sisters either sign away their in favour of their brother or sell it to him at a nominal price. This code of conduct is observed knowingly by both the natal and conjugal families. Brother-sister bonds of love have also been greatly encouraged, visible in the noticeable revival of the Raksha Bandhan festival and the renewed sanctity it has claimed in north India.

== Voluntary kin relations ==
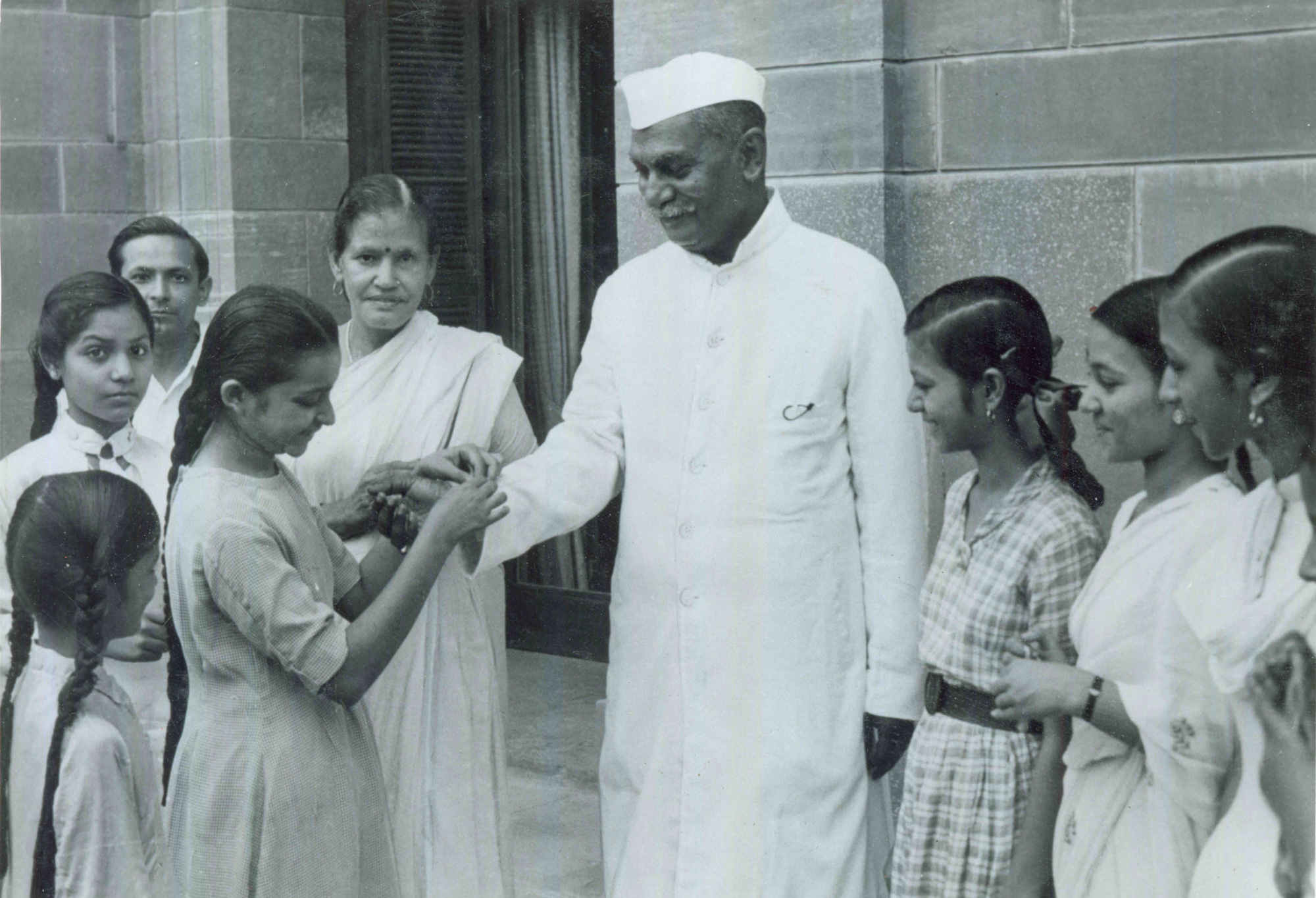
Rajendra Prasad, first president of the Republic of India, celebrating Raksha Bandhan at the presidential palace, Rashtrapati Bhawan, 24 August 1953

Among women and men who are not blood relatives, there is also a transformed tradition of voluntary kin relations, achieved through the tying of rakhi amulets, which have cut across caste and class lines, and Hindu and Muslim divisions. In some communities or contexts, other figures, such as a matriarch, or a person in authority, can be included in the ceremony in ritual acknowledgement of their benefaction. According to author Prem Chowdhry, "The same symbolic protection is also requested from the high caste men by the low caste women in a work relationship situation. The ritual thread is offered, though not tied and higher caste men customarily give some money in return."

== Regional variations in ritual ==
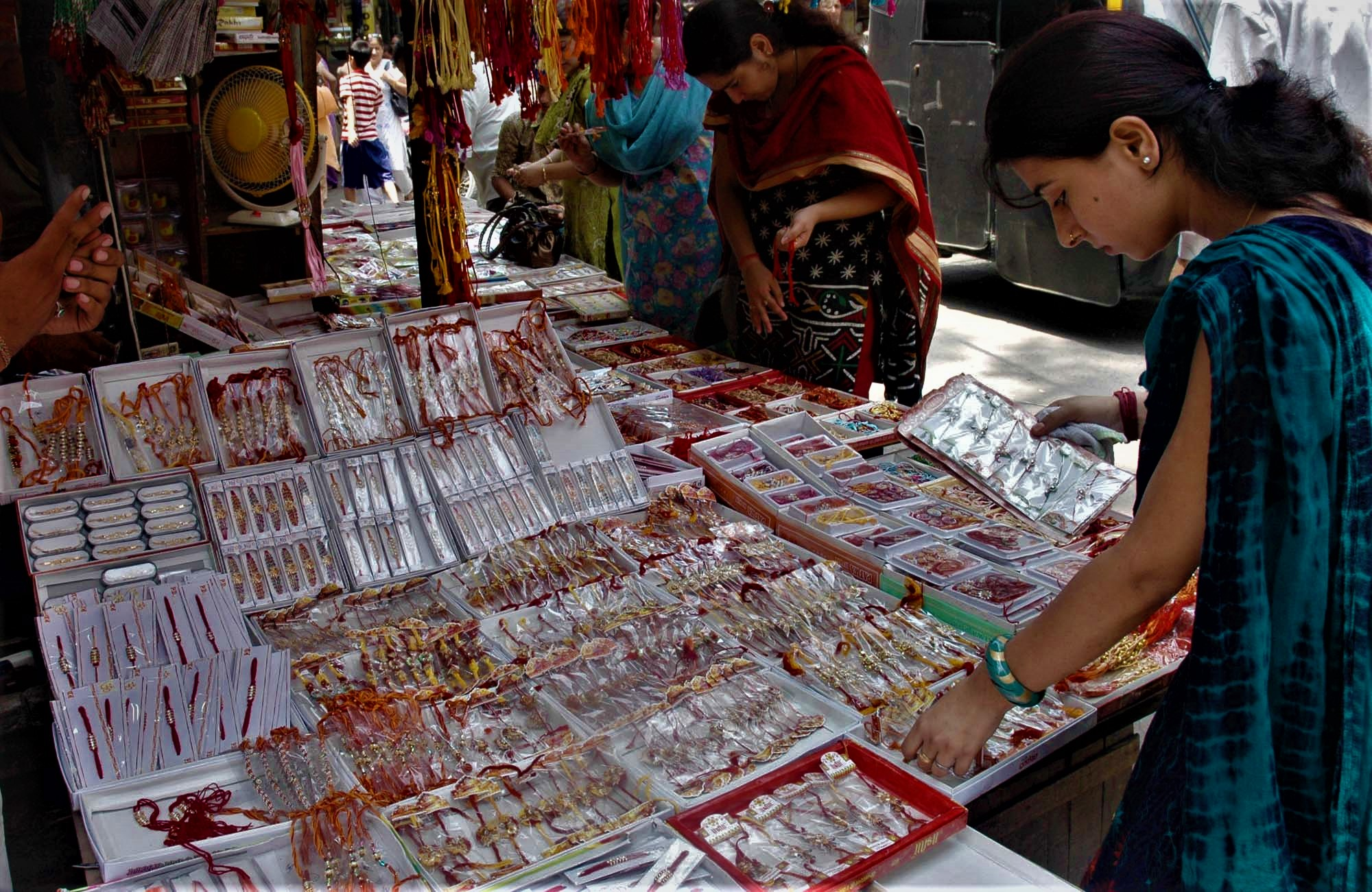
Women shopping for rakhi

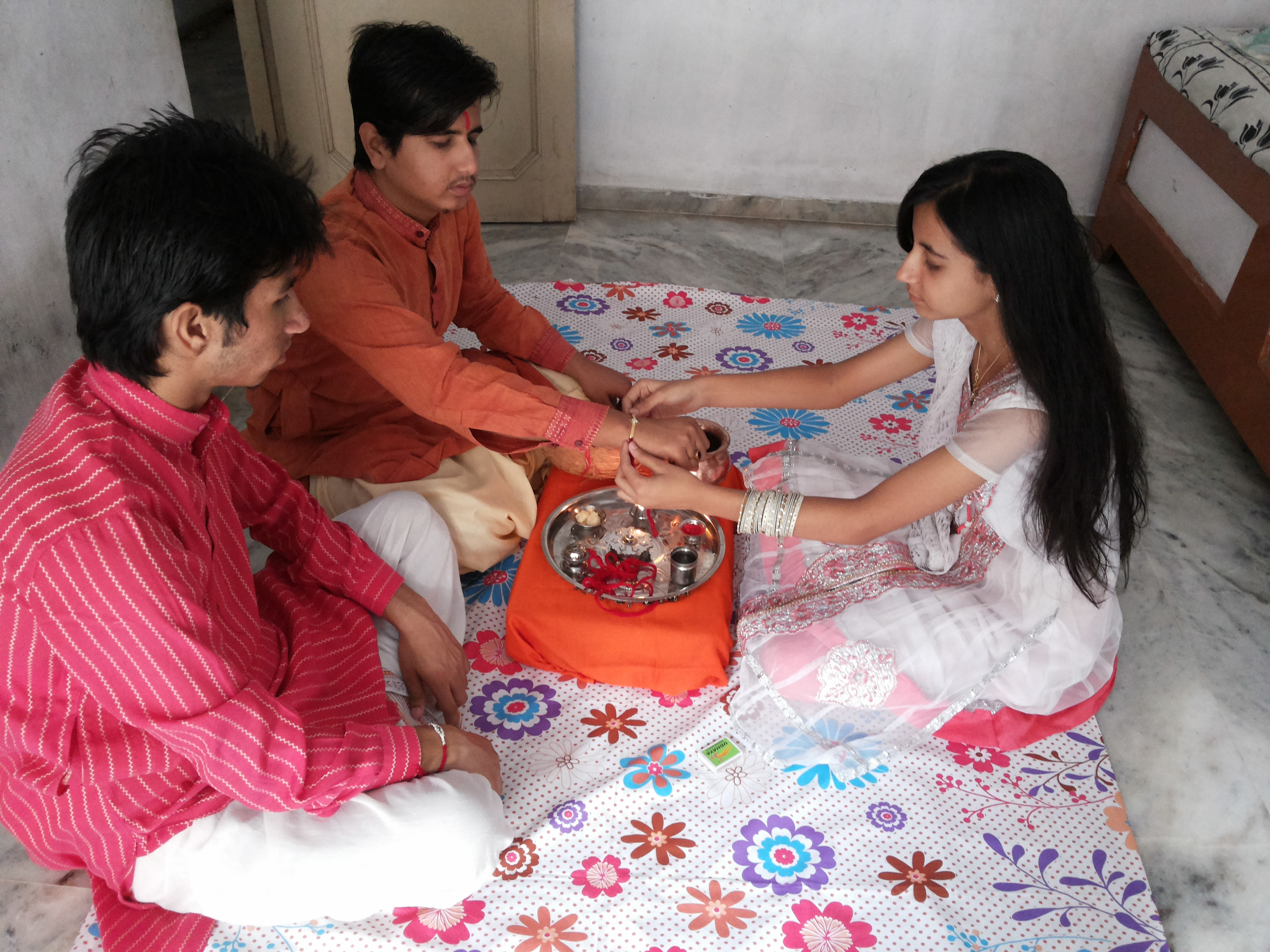
Tying the rakhi on the wrist

While Raksha Bandhan is celebrated in various parts of India, different regions mark the day in different ways.

In the state of West Bengal, this day is also called Jhulan Purnima. Prayers and puja of Krishna and Radha are performed there. Sisters tie rakhi to brothers and wish immortality. Political parties, offices, friends, and educational institutions celebrate this day with a new hope for a good relationship.

In Maharashtra, among the Koli community, the festival of Raksha Bandhan / Rakhi Pournima is celebrated along with Narali Poornima (coconut day festival). Kolis are the fishermen community of the coastal state. The fishermen offer prayers to Varuna, the Hindu god of the sea, to invoke his blessings, and throw coconuts into the sea as offerings to him. The girls and women tie rakhi on their brother's wrist, as elsewhere.

In many regions of North India, it is a common practice to fly kites on the nearby occasions of Janamashtami and Raksha Bandhan. The locals buy kilometres of strong kite string, commonly called gattu door in the local language, along with a multitude of kites.

In Nepal, Raksha Bandhan is referred to as Janai Purnima or Rishitarpani, and involves a sacred thread ceremony. It is observed by both Hindus and Buddhists of Nepal. The Hindu men change the thread they wear around their chests (janai), while in some parts of Nepal girls and women tie rakhi on their brother's wrists. The Raksha Bandhan-like brother sister festival is observed by other Hindus of Nepal during one of the days of the Tihar (or Diwali) festival.

The festival is observed by the Shaiva Hindus, and is popularly known in Newar community as Gunhu Punhi.

In Odisha, Raksha Bandhan is also called Rakhi Purnima / Gamha Purnima. A sister ties rakhi around her brother's wrist as a mark of love and honour and the brother promises to protect his sister from all the difficulties. The name Gamha Purnima refers to the celebration on the same day of the birthday of Lord Balabhadra, considered the god of farming; farmers in Odisha tie rakhis to cattle on this day.

== Depictions in movies and popular history ==
The religious myths claimed as the basis of Raksha Bandhan are disputed, and some historians consider the historical stories associated with it to be apocryphal.

=== Jai Santoshi Maa (1975 film) ===
The 1975 film Jai Santoshi Maa tells a story in which Ganesha had two sons, Shubha and Labha. The two boys became frustrated that they had no sister to celebrate Raksha Bandhan with. They asked their father Ganesha for a sister, but to no avail. Finally, the sage Narada appeared, who persuaded Ganesha that a daughter would enrich him as well as his sons. Ganesha agreed, and created a daughter named Santoshi Maa by divine flames that emerged from Ganesh's wives, Riddhi (Amazing) and Siddhi (Perfection). Thereafter, Shubha Labha (literally "Holy Profit") had a sister named Santoshi Maa (literally "Goddess of Satisfaction"), to tie rakhi on Raksha Bandhan.

According to author Lawrence Cohen:

[I]n Varanasi the paired figures were usually called Ṛddhi and Siddhi, Gaṇeśa's relationship to them was often vague. He was their mālik, their owner; they were more often dasīs than patnīs (wives). Yet Gaṇeśa was married to them, albeit within a marriage different from other divine matches in the lack of a clear familial context. Such a context has recently emerged in the popular film Jai Santoshī Mā. The film builds upon a text, also of recent vintage, in which Gaṇeśa has a daughter, the neophyte goddess of satisfaction, Santoshī Mā. In the film, the role of Gaṇeśa as family man is developed significantly. Santoshī Mā's genesis occurs on Rāksa bandan. Gaṇeśa's sister is visiting for the tying of the rākhī. He calls her bahenmansa—his "mind-born" sister. Gaṇeśa's wives, Ṛddhi and Siddhi, are also present, with their sons Śubha and Lābha. The boys are jealous, as they, unlike their father, have no sister with whom to tie the rākhī. They and the other women plead with their father, but to no avail; but then Narada appears and convinces Ganesha that the creation of an illustrious daughter will reflect much credit back onto himself. Ganesha assents and from Ṛddhi and Siddhi emerges a flame that engenders Santoshī Mā.

=== Sikandar (1941 film) ===
Film historian Anja Wieber describes the manufacture of a modern and widespread Indian legend in the 1941 movie Sikandar:

In Sikandar a very daring Roxane follows Alexander incognito to India and manages to gain admission to King Porus (in the Indian version: Puru), a conversation with a young, friendly Indian village woman named Surmaniya, Roxane learns about the Indian feast of Rakhi which is being celebrated at that very moment with the purpose of strengthening the bond between sister and brother (0:25–0:30). On this occasion, sisters tie a ribbon (i.e. rakhi) to their brothers' arms to symbolize their close relationships, and brothers offer presents and assistance in return. Besides, Roxane is also told that the relationship need not be one of consanguinity; every girl can choose a brother. Therefore, she decides to offer the rakhi to King Porus, who accepts the relationship after some hesitation, because he feels the need to apologize to Roxane, Darius's (a.k.a. Dara's) daughter, for not having helped her father when he asked for assistance against Alexander. As a result of their bond, he offers her gifts befitting her rank and promises not to harm Alexander (0:32–35). Later, when Porus comes into hand-to-hand combat with the Greek king, he stands by his promise and spares him (1:31). Interestingly, the rakhi episode with Porus is still to this day very popular in India and is cited as very early historical evidence for the origin of the authentic Hindu festival called Raksha Bandhan. Although examples of that legend can be traced in internet forums, Indian newspapers, a children's book and an educational video, I was not able to find its ancient origin.

=== Rani Karnavati and Emperor Humayun ===
Bound by a sacred gift, in happier hours,
To prove a brother's undecaying faith;
Now when the star of Kurnivati lowers,
He rushes on to danger or to death.

He came to the beleaguered walls too late,
Vain was the splendid sacrifice to save;
Famine and death were sitting at the gate,
The flower of Rajasthan had found a grave.

— From poem, "The Rakhi," in Oriental scenes, dramatic sketches, and tales (1832), by Emma Roberts, p. 125

Another controversial historical account is that of Rani Karnavati of Chittor and Mughal Emperor Humayun, which dates to 1535 CE. When Rani Karnavati, the widowed queen of the king of Chittor, realised that she could not defend against the invasion by the Sultan of Gujarat, Bahadur Shah, she sent a rakhi to Emperor Humayun. The Emperor, according to one version of the story, set off with his troops to defend Chittor. He arrived too late, and Bahadur Shah had already captured the Rani's fortress. Alternative accounts from the period, including those by historians in Humayun's Mughal court, do not mention the rakhi episode and some historians have expressed skepticism whether it ever happened. Historian Satish Chandra wrote,

... According to a mid-seventeenth century Rajasthani account, Rani Karnavati, the Rana's mother, sent a bracelet as rakhi to Humayun, who gallantly responded and helped. Since none of the contemporary sources mention this, little credit can be given to this story ...

Humayun's own memoirs never mention this, and give different reasons for his war with Sultan Bahadur Shah of Gujarat in 1535.

== See also ==
- Bhai Dooj – Hindu festival
- Friendship bracelet – Bracelet given as a symbol of friendship
- Other festivals observed on the day of Raksha Bandhan
- Siblings Day – Holiday honouring relationships of siblings
