= Susan Snow Wadley =

American anthropologist

- Born: 1943 (age 82–83)
- Occupation: Anthropologist
- Board member of: Publications Committee of American Institute of Indian Studies (Chairperson)
- Spouse: Rick Olanoff
- Parent: Ellen (mother)

Academic background
- Education: Doctor of Philosophy
- Alma mater: Carlton College (B.A.); University of Chicago (M.A. and Ph.D.)
- Thesis: Shakti: Power in the Conceptual Structure of Karimpur Religion (1973)
- Academic advisors: McKim Marriott; Milton Singer (Initial research advisors)

Academic work
- Discipline: Anthropology
- Institutions: Former director, South Asia Center of the Syracuse University
- Main interests: South Asia, specially India

Susan Snow Wadley (born 1943) is an American anthropologist.

Born in 1943, she completed her M.A. and Ph.D. from the University of Chicago in 1967 and 1973, respectively. She has worked at the Syracuse University as a professor of South Asian Studies and the former director of its South Asia Center. She has carried out numerous field studies in India for nearly 6 decades with financial support from various entities from the United States.

== Education ==
Wadley did her B.A. from the Carlton College in the field of psychology. She did her M.A. from the University of Chicago in 1967 with the thesis titled "'Fate' and the Gods in the Panjabi Cult of Gugga: A Structural Semantic Analysis". At the University of Chicago, she also completed her Ph.D. in anthropology in 1973. Her doctoral dissertation was titled Shakti: Power in the Conceptual Structure of Karimpur Religion. It was an analysis and collection of a north India village's stories and songs.

== Career ==
Wadley is a Ford–Maxwell professor emerita of South Asian Studies at the Department of Anthropology of Syracuse University. She is the former director of the university's South Asia Center. She has also served as the associate dean of the university's Department of Arts and Sciences.

She is the present chairperson of the publications committee of the American Institute of Indian Studies and also of the board of directors of the South Asian Summer Language Institute. She has been a board member of the Open Hand Theatre for nearly 2 decades and had also served as the theatre's president.

== Research ==
The focus of Wadley's studies has been mainly on the study of folklore, folk art traditions, gender issues, religion, and social change in India. Her research interests also includes the study of the effects of the "socioeconomic change" on the female populace of northern India's countryside areas. Rutgers University's Michael Moffatt notes that Wadley is one of the few anthropologists who write monographs on the villages of India. She also have interest in the fields of language, culture and society, and globalization.

She began her anthropological research on India by receiving research grant from the Carnegie Foundation and working in the guidance of McKim Marriott and Milton Singer. Later, her research was funded by the entities like the National Science Foundation, the Smithsonian Institution, and the United States Department of Education. In 1989, she received a grant for the post doctoral fellowship from the Social Science Research Council.

She executed numerous research projects as part of her field research in India which includes Attitudes Towards Girls' Education in a Village Near Delhi (1963–1964), Religious Ideologies and Practices in Karimpur, Uttar Pradesh (1967–1969), The Modernization and Standardization of Hindu Religious Practices in Hindi–speaking North India (1974–1975), Changing Lives: Karimpur Villagers 1925–1984 (1983–1984), The North Indian Epic Dhola (1989, 1990, and 1994), Social Change and Globalization in Rural Uttar Pradesh (1998), Social Change and Oral Epics in Rural Uttar Pradesh (2002), Rural–urban Connections, Uttar Pradesh and Delhi (2005), Social Change in Rural Uttar Pradesh (2010), Mithila Folk Art, Madhubani, Bihar (2010–2011).

== Written work ==
Wadley's Struggling with Destiny in Karimpur, 1925–1984 (1994) was a monographic study of a north Indian village. Moffatt stated that the ethnosociological work done by Wadley was shaped by McKim Marriott's influence on her. Her research on the subject matter was supplemented by the large "unpublished data" which she had received from Charlotte Viall Wiser and William H. Wiser. According to Moffatt, Wadley's work was an "attempt to condense the rich, multi–investigative, long–term research into a single comprehensive account".

Wadley wrote Raja Nal and the Goddess: The North Indian Epic Dhola in Performance (2004) after over 3 decades of "researching and recording" Dhola, an oral epic which is performed in northwestern and northern regions of India and has some goddesses, women and a king named Nal as its heroes. She also did field study in a village in India for her research data. Sadhana Naithani of the Jawaharlal Nehru University noted that Wadley conducted her research on the epic at a time when it is dying out. She stated that though Wadley realized that "Dhola lives in performance", she could not "capture the dynamism of the performance context". According to Naithani, Wadley's "retelling" of the epic was "vastly condensed" which was itself "based on another condensed version".

Wadley's Essays on North Indian Folk Traditions (2005) was "an analysis of the oral traditions" of an Indian village. Her work in the book was based on the field research carried out by her in the village between 1967 and 2002 and the earlier ethnographic research done by the Wisers. Archana Shukla of the University of Delhi stated that Wadley provided "primary and secondary data" and inquired into and compared "the realms of oral and written folk traditions". According to Fabrizio M. Ferrari, Wadley individuated "major issues in the dramatic representation of local epics and their relation with the written Sanskrit tradition".

The village Karimpur of India's Uttar Pradesh which is mentioned in her published works is a pseudonym used by her in place of the real name of the village where she carried out her research.

== Personal life ==
Wadley is married to Rick Olanoff, and they have 4 daughters.

== Works ==
=== Books ===
- Wadley, Susan S. (2005). Essays on North Indian Folk Traditions. New Delhi, India: Chronicle. ISBN 978-8180280160. LCCN 2005385234. OCLC 1045892614.
- Wadley, Susan S. (2004). Raja Nal and the Goddess: The North Indian Epic Dhola in Performance (illustrated ed.). Bloomington, Indiana, USA: Indiana University Press. ISBN 978-0253111272. LCCN 2004009434. OCLC 68924866.
- Wadley, Susan S. (1994). Struggling with Destiny in Karimpur, 1925–1984 (illustrated ed.). Berkeley, California, USA: University of California Press. ISBN 978-0520084070. LCCN 93048297. OCLC 29634473.
- Wadley, Susan S.; Jacobson, Doranne (1992). Women in India: Two Perspectives (2nd, enlarged ed.). New Delhi, India: Manohar. ISBN 978-8185425375. LCCN 92909252.

=== Books edited ===
- Wadley, Susan S., ed. (2014). South Asia in the World: An Introduction. Foundations in Global Studies: The Regional Landscape (illustrated ed.). New York, USA: M. E. Sharpe. ISBN 978-1317459583. LCCN 2013021142.
- Wadley, Susan S.; Babb, Lawrence A., eds. (1995). Media and the Transformation of Religion in South Asia (illustrated ed.). Philadelphia, USA: University of Pennsylvania Press. ISBN 978-0812215472. LCCN 95013168. OCLC 1091525701.
- Wadley, Susan S.; Daniel, Sheryl B., eds. (1980). The Powers of Tamil Women. Foreign and Comparative Studies: South Asian Series, No. 6 (reprint ed.). New York, USA: Maxwell School of Citizenship and Public Affairs, Syracuse University. ISBN 978-0915984824. LCCN 80025410. OCLC 1129474432.

=== Selected papers ===
- Wadley, Susan S.; Derr, Bruce W. (1989). "Eating Sins in Karimpur". Contributions to Indian Sociology. 23 (1). SAGE: 131–148. doi:10.1177/006996689023001008. S2CID 144733923.
- Wadley, Susan S. (1976). "The Spirit 'Rides' or the Spirit 'Comes': Possession in a North Indian Village". In Bharati, Agehananda (ed.). The Realm of the Extra–Human: Agents and Audiences. World Anthropology. Vol. 1. De Gruyter Mouton. pp. 233–252. doi:10.1515/9783110805840.233. ISBN 9783110805840.
- Wadley, Susan Snow . 1967. `Fate' and the Gods in the Panjabi cult of Gugga: a structural semantic analysis. Unpublished master's paper, Department of Anthropology, University of Chicago.
