= Karkata =

Month in Indian lunisolar calendars

Karkaṭa, also referred to as Karka or Karkatha, is a month in the Indian solar calendar. It corresponds to the zodiacal sign of Cancer, and overlaps approximately with the later half of July and early half of August in the Gregorian calendar.

In Vedic texts, the Karka month is called Suchi (IAST: Śuchi), but in these ancient texts it has no zodiacal associations. The solar month of Karkata overlaps with its lunar month Shraavana, in Hindu lunisolar calendars. The Shraavana marks the middle of the monsoon season on the Indian subcontinent, and is preceded by the solar month of Mithuna, and followed by the solar month of Siṃha.

The Karkata month is called Adi in the Tamil Hindu calendar. The ancient and medieval era Sanskrit texts of India vary in their calculations about the duration of Karkata, just like they do with other months. For example, the Surya Siddhanta calculates the duration of Karkata to be 31 days, 11 hours, 24 minutes and 24 seconds. In contrast, the Arya Siddhanta calculates the duration of the Karkata month to be 31 days, 11 hours, 13 minutes and 36 seconds.

The Indian solar month names are significant in epigraphical studies of South Asia. For example, Karkaṭa month, along with other solar months are found inscribed in medieval era temples. The Karkaṭa month (spelled as Karkataka) is found inscribed in Chola Empire monument such as the Valisvara temple near Tamil Nadu–Andhra Pradesh border.

Karka is also an astrological sign in Indian horoscope systems, corresponding to Cancer (astrology).

Karkata is also the sixteenth month in the Darian calendar for the planet Mars, when the Sun traverses the constellation Cancer as seen from Mars.
