= Upakarma =

Hindu observance

Upakarma (Sanskrit: उपाकर्म, romanized: Upākarma, lit. 'Beginning'), also called Avani Avittam (Tamil: ஆவணி அவிட்டம், Malayalam: ആവണി അവിട്ടം, romanized: Āvaṇi Aviṭṭam), Janivarada Hunnime (Kannada: ಜನಿವಾರದ ಹುಣ್ಣಿಮೆ, romanized: Janivārada Huṇṇime), Gahma Purnima (Odia: ଗହ୍ମା ପୂର୍ଣିମା, romanized: Gahmā Pūrṇimā), and Jamdhyala Paurnami (Telugu: జంధ్యాల పౌర్ణమి, romanized: Jaṁdhyāla Paurṇami) is a Vedic ritual practiced by Hindus. During the ritual, men revise their learning of Vedas, change their sacred thread and begin to don a new one.

Upakarma is conducted once a year during the Shravana or Dhanishtha nakshatra of the Hindu month of Shravana, when Brahmins change their yajñopavītam thread with Vedic rituals, making offerings to the rishis who composed the Vedic hymns. The day, also called Shravana Purnima ("Full Moon of Shravana") in other parts of India, usually occurs the day after the Shravana nakshatra, which marks Kerala's Onam festival. On the following day, usually coinciding with the Raksha Bandhan festival in North and Central India, the Gayatri Mantra is recited 1,008 times.

Samaveda Brahmins perform upakarma and change their thread on the third day of the month of Bhadra.

== Legend ==
On the full-moon day of the month of Shravana, Vishnu (as Hayagriva) is said to have restored the Vedas stolen from Brahma by the daityas Madhu-Kaitabha. After Vishnu created Brahma from the lotus upon his navel, he created two drops of sweat on his skin, which were imbued with the attributes of tamas (darkness) and rajas (activity). Madhu and Kaitabha were born from these drops, whereupon they started to worship Mahadevi, acquiring the boon of dying only when they desired. Now haughty, the brothers stole the Vedas from Brahma, hiding themselves in Patala. Helpless, Brahma prayed to Vishnu. The deity confronted the brothers and fought them. Impressed with their prowess, Vishnu offered the brothers a boon of their choice. Drunk with power, the daityas laughed and asked Vishnu to ask a boon from them instead. The deity sought the boon of gaining the ability to slay them. Flabbergasted, the brothers granted him the boon of being able to kill them anywhere but upon the water. Even as they expanded in size, Vishnu caught them, placing them upon his thighs and decapitating them with his celestial discus, the Sudarshana Chakra. Thus, the Vedas were restored to Brahma.

== Observance ==
The day on which the upakarma is performed differs by sect. Students of the Yajurveda observe their upakarma on the full moon of the month of the Shravana month (August–September; Avani in the Tamil calendar). Rigvedic upakarma is observed on the day of Shravana when the waxing moon is in the Shravana lunar station. Rigvedic Brahmins change their sacred thread on this day.

For the observance of Avani Avittam, a Brahmin is prescribed his usual morning rites, which include the following: prayer before bathing, the donning of clean clothes, ritually sipping water thrice in the name of Vishnu, the rite of sandhyavandanam, which comprises meditating on the sun god Surya and reciting the Gayatri Mantra. The Brahmin is to study the Vedas with his guru (preceptor), who sits facing the east while he recites scripture, while the former sits facing the west and repeats the same. This rite resumes until midday, until the entirety of the Vedas is recited. The midday bath is to be performed, which is followed by the worship of one's ancestors. Sesame seeds mixed with water are ritually offered to the ancestors, with the hollow of each hands joined. Oblations of fire with prayer to different deities is to be performed. On this occasion, the kamokarshit prayer is recited 108 times, which affirms that any deviation from prescribed ritual practices originated from passion rather than from one's soul, which remains pure. Brahmins gather in the local waterbody where they chant the sankalpa prayer for the purification of sins. After this ritual, the Brahmin wears a new sacred thread and discards the old one, which symbolically represents the recommencement of sacred studies and renewal of ritual purity.
