= Padua (disambiguation) =

Padua is a city in northern Italy.

Padua may also refer to:

== Places ==
- San Antonio de Padua, a city in Buenos Aires, Argentina
- Province of Padua, Veneto, Italy
- Padua, Illinois, an unincorporated community, US
- Padua, Minnesota, an unincorporated community, US
- Padua, Ohio, unincorporated community, US
- 363 Padua, a main belt asteroid

== Schools and universities ==
- University of Padua, Italy
- Padua College, Brisbane, Australia
- Padua College, Melbourne, Australia
- Padua Franciscan High School, Parma, Ohio, US
- Padua Academy, Wilmington, Delaware, US

== Other uses ==
- Anthony of Padua, a Roman Catholic saint
- Padua (ship), a sailing vessel
- Padua, a cultivar of Karuka
- Padua, Chauddagram Upazila, Comilla District, Bangladesh

== See also ==
- San Antonio de Padua (disambiguation)
- Padwa (disambiguation)
