= San Antonio de Padua, Antioquia =

San Antonio de Pahua
- Populated center
- Location in Antioquia and Colombia San Antonio de Pahua (Colombia)
- Coordinates: 6°17′14.64″N 76°45′43.2″W
- Country: Colombia
- Department: Antioquia
- Municipality: Vigía del Fuerte
- Elevation: 62 ft (19 m)

Population (2005)
  - Total: 1,059
- Time zone: UTC-5 (Colombia Standard Time)

San Antonio de Padua is a populated center of Colombia in Vigía del Fuerte Municipality, Antioquia Department in Colombia. It is surrounded by a dense tropical rainforest.

== Climate ==
San Antonio de Padua has a very wet tropical rainforest climate (Af). It is the wettest place in the department of Antioquia.

Climate data for San Antonio de Padua
Month	Jan	Feb	Mar	Apr	May	Jun	Jul	Aug	Sep	Oct	Nov	Dec	Year
Mean daily maximum °C (°F)	30.3 (86.5)	30.3 (86.5)	30.8 (87.4)	30.5 (86.9)	29.8 (85.6)	29.9 (85.8)	29.9 (85.8)	29.9 (85.8)	29.4 (84.9)	29.0 (84.2)	29.3 (84.7)	29.8 (85.6)	29.9 (85.8)
Daily mean °C (°F)	26.0 (78.8)	26.1 (79.0)	26.6 (79.9)	26.4 (79.5)	26.1 (79.0)	26.1 (79.0)	26.0 (78.8)	26.1 (79.0)	25.9 (78.6)	25.4 (77.7)	25.6 (78.1)	26.0 (78.8)	26.0 (78.9)
Mean daily minimum °C (°F)	21.8 (71.2)	22.0 (71.6)	22.4 (72.3)	22.4 (72.3)	22.4 (72.3)	22.3 (72.1)	22.2 (72.0)	22.3 (72.1)	22.4 (72.3)	21.9 (71.4)	21.9 (71.4)	22.2 (72.0)	22.2 (71.9)
Average rainfall mm (inches)	388 (15.3)	356 (14.0)	360 (14.2)	696 (27.4)	641 (25.2)	583 (23.0)	687 (27.0)	606 (23.9)	483 (19.0)	532 (20.9)	506 (19.9)	487 (19.2)	6,325 (249)
