= Shravana (month) =

Fourth month of the Hindu lunar calendar

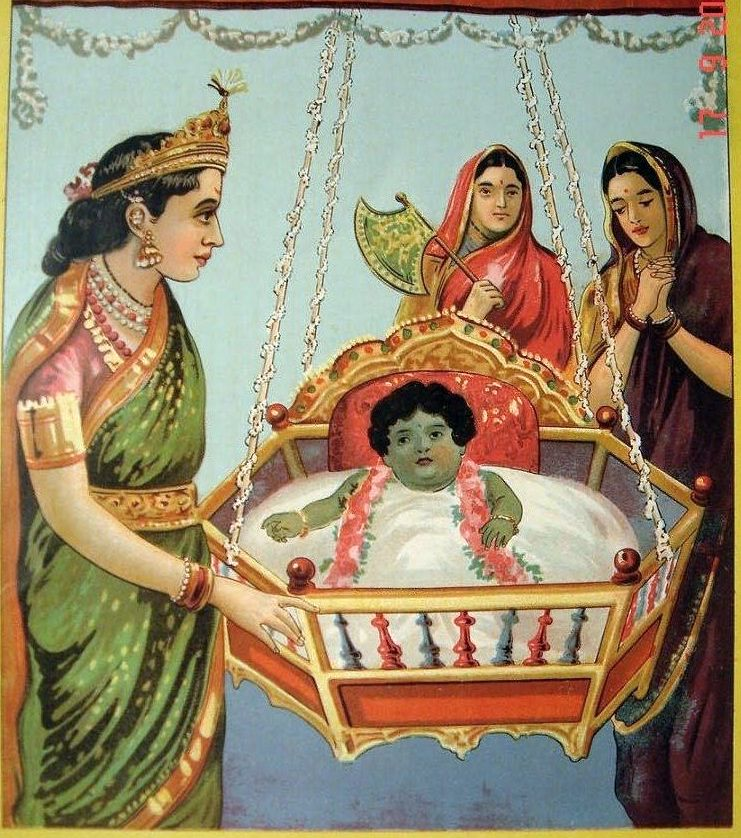
- Janmashtami is celebrated in the month of Shravana and commemorates the birth of Krishna
- Native name: Śrāvaṇa (Sanskrit)
- Calendar: Hindu calendar
- Month number: 5
- Number of days: 29 or 30
- Season: Varsha (monsoon)
- Gregorian equivalent: July–August
- Significant days: Haryali Teej; Krishna Janmashtami; Naga Panchami; Pola; Raksha Bandhan; Upakarma

Shravana is the fifth month of the Hindu lunar calendar and the Indian national calendar. The name of the month is derived from the position of the Moon near the Shravana nakshatra (star) on the full moon day. The month corresponds to the monsoon (Varsha) season and falls in July–August of the Gregorian calendar.

In the Hindu solar calendar, it corresponds to the month of Karkata and begins with the Sun's entry into Cancer. This is also believed that wearing asupicious shravan month colours according to your zodiac signs can be fruitful and brings prospertiy.It corresponds to Srabon, the fourth month in the Bengali calendar. In the Tamil calendar, it corresponds to the fifth month of Avani, falling in the Gregorian months of August–September. In the Vaishnav calendar, it corresponds to the fifth month of Sridhara.

In the Hindu lunar calendar, each month has 29 or 30 days. The month begins on the next day after Amavasya (new moon) or Purnima (full moon), according to the amanta and the purnimanta systems respectively. A month consists of two cycles of 15 days each, Shukla Paksha (waxing moon) and Krishna Paksha (waning moon). Days in each cycle are labeled as a thithi, with each thithi repeating twice in a month.

== Festivals ==
In Hinduism, the month of Shravana is associated with the worship of Shiva. Devotees perform various rituals to seek his blessings and spiritual growth. Many devotees observe fasts on Mondays during the month, a practice known as Shravana Somvar.

In parts of North India, Shravana (also known as Sawan) is associated with the annual Kanwar Yatra, a pilgrimage dedicated to Shiva. During the pilgrimage, devotees known as Kanwariyas carry water from the Ganges in containers suspended from a pole called a kanwar and offer it at Shiva temples. The pilgrimage takes place during July and August, with large numbers of devotees participating across northern India.

=== Haryali Teej ===
Haryali Teej is celebrated on the Tritiya (third day) thithi after Amavasya (new moon). It commemorates the reunion of Shiva and Parvati, after Parvati fasted for years before being accepted by Shiva in her 108th birth.

In Nepal, Teej is associated with women's gatherings in which women and girls sing and dance, observe fasting, and perform ritual bathing on Rishi Panchami. Married women traditionally return to their natal homes to celebrate the festival. Teej is also associated with a tradition of women's songs. Ethnographic research on Tij in Nepal found that these songs address women's experiences within family and social relationships and can serve as forms of social and political commentary. The songs may be composed or adapted from year to year, reflecting contemporary concerns as well as personal experiences.

=== Janmashtami ===
Krishna Janmashtami marks the birth of Hindu god Krishna and is celebrated on the Ashtami (eighth day) thithi of Krishna Paksha. It is one of the major Hindu festivals, especially those following Vaishnava traditions.

=== Naga Panchami ===
Naga Panchami is celebrated on the Panchami (fifth day) thithi of Shukla Paksha of the Shravana month. The day is dedicated to the worship of the snake god Nāga. In Karnataka, Basava Panchami is celebrated on the fifth day after Amavasya, and commemorates the day when Lingayat saint Basava attained moksha in 1196 CE.

In North India, Nag Panchami is observed during the Hindu month of Shravana and is associated with the worship of snakes. In Banaras, the festival is also connected with traditional wrestling schools (akharas), where wrestlers honour their gurus and participate in demonstrations and wrestling competitions.

In Banaras and parts of northwestern India, traditional wrestling schools (akharas) hold special functions during Nag Panchami. The wrestling grounds are cleaned, repaired, and repainted, while shrines are refurbished and decorated with flags and mango leaves. Priests perform blessings before the wrestlers’ demonstrations and other festivities begin.

Nag Panchami is also an occasion for wrestling tournaments, known as dangals, at many akharas. Wrestlers demonstrate the skills they have developed through a year of training, while spectators gather to watch. Alter notes that some wrestling grounds become public arenas in which even people without formal wrestling experience may challenge others to a bout

=== Purnima ===
Various Hindu religious festivals are celebrated on the Purnima (full moon) day of the month. Raksha Bandhan celebrates the bond between brothers and sisters, wherein sister(s) tie a thread on the brother's wrist. In Haryana and Punjab, people observe the festival of Salono. During the day, priests tie amulets on people's wrists for protection against evil. This festival also involves, a sister tying a thread called ponchi on a brother's hand.

On the Purnima day, certain communities such as Brahmins perform rituals associated with Upakarma. Men change their sacred thread and begin to don a new one on the day annually.

Narali Poornima is celebrated in parts of Western India, where coconuts are offered to Hindu god Varuna. It marks the beginning of the fishing season, and the fishermen make an offering to the god for a bountiful harvest. The day of Purnima is also celebrated as Balarama's birthday.

In Odisha, Gamha Purnima is celebrated, during which domesticated cows and bullocks are decorated and worshipped. Country-made sweets such as pitha and mitha are made and distributed among families, relatives and friends. In Jagannath culture, Krishna and Radha are believed to have enjoyed the rainy season of the month while playing on a swing. The celebration commemorating the event usually starts on Ekadashi (four days before Purnima) and ends with Jhulan yatra on Gamha Purnima. The murtis of Radha-Krishna are decorated and placed on a swing (jhulan) on the day.

In parts of Central India such as Madhya Pradesh, Chhattisgarh and Jharkhand, the Purnima day is celebrated as Kajari Purnima. The festivities start on Navami (ninth day) after Amavasya, and end on the full moon day. Women who have sons, perform various rituals on the day. In parts of Gujarat, the Purnima day marks the event of Pavitropana. On this day, people perform puja to worship Shiva. Cotton threads or strands of grass are soaked in panchagavya, and tied around a lingam.

=== Pola ===
Pola is a festival celebrated in parts of Maharashtra. It is a thanksgiving festival celebrated to honor the oxen, which had helped with the farming activities.

=== Others ===
On the Ekadashi (11th day) thithi, Vaishnavas in parts of Gujarat and Rajasthan celebrate the birth of Pushti marga, the path of grace. Vallabhacharya offered a sacred thread (pavitra soothan) to god Krishna on this day. To commemorate this, divine threads are offered to devotees on the day. On the Dwitiya thithi, Raghavendra Swami Punyathithi is observed, which commemorates the day when Hindu saint Raghavendra Tirtha, who advocated Madhvacharya's Dvaita philosophy, achieved moksha in 1671 CE.

== Yatras ==
The annual Kanwar Yatra is held during the month. Primarily practiced in the Indo-Gangetic plains, devotees of Shiva, known as Kanwarias, travel by foot carrying holy water from the Ganges to various Hindu pilgrimage places such as Haridwar, Gaumukh, and Gangotri. During the Shravani mela, thousands of pilgrims walk about 100 km (62 mi), carrying the Ganges water from Sultanganj to Deoghar.

== See also ==
- Astronomical basis of the Hindu calendar
- Hindu astrology
- Hindu calendar
- Indian astronomy
- Indian units of measurement
