= Milton Singer =

American anthropologist (1912–1994)

Milton Borah Singer (July 5, 1912 – 1994) was a leading American anthropologist and expert on Indian studies. He was a professor at the University of Chicago. Singer was the first to use the phrase Semiotic Anthropology in 1978.

== Biography ==
Singer was born to Julius Singer and Esther Greenberg in Poland on July 5, 1912. His parents emigrated to the United States, settling in Detroit in 1920, and the family was naturalized in 1921.

Singer received a B.A. in psychology in 1934 and an M.A. in philosophy in 1936, both from the University of Texas at Austin. His M.A. thesis, "George Herbert Mead's Social-Behavioristic Theory of Mind," prefigured his move to the University of Chicago, where he completed a dissertation "On Formal Method in Mathematical Logic," under the supervision of Rudolf Carnap, in 1940.

He received the Quantrell Award.

He was a social science instructor at the University of Chicago in 1941 and a director of the social sciences department from 1947 to 1952, and in 1954 he became a professor of anthropology until his retirement in 1979. In the early 1960s, he organized studies in South Asia.

He traveled to India in his fieldwork, during the years 1954–1955, 1960–1961 and 1964, also developing important contact with researchers of this country. His research centered on the discussion of tradition in the industrialized city of Madras and the Sanskrit tradition in modern urban centers. In the years 1970 and 1980 Singer directs his interests to the studies of the historical roots of the anthropological theories and also of the cultural symbolism. His field work focuses on comparative research into the modernization of American culture in Newburyport, Massachusetts and India, including a deepening of studies of logic and philosophy.

== Works ==
- Singer, Milton 1978. For a semiotic anthropology. In: Sebeok, Thomas A. (ed.), Sight, Sound, and Sense. (Approaches to Semiotics.) Bloomington: Indiana University Press, 202–231.
