= Festivals in Kolkata =

Kolkata has many festivals throughout the year. The largest and most magnificently celebrated festival of the city is Durga Puja, and it features colourful pandals, decorative idols of the Hindu goddess Durga and her family, lighting decorations and fireworks. Other major festivals are Diwali, Kali Puja, Holi, Saraswati Puja, Poush Parbon, Poila Boishakh, Christmas, Eid al-Fitr, and Eid al-Adha.

== Bengali New Year ==
The Bengali New Year or "Poila Baisakh" (the first day of the month of Baisakh) is celebrated around 15 April on the basis of the lunar calendar of Bangabda. Visitors to homes are greeted with sweets, and trade establishments are decorated with auspicious garlands of marigold and 'aam' leaves. Shop-owners and businessmen offer puja at Dakshineshwar Kali Temple and Kalighat Kali Temple in the morning with new ledgers (halkhata). Businessmen also offer free sweets as a goodwill gesture on this day. It is celebrated by cultural programmes throughout Kolkata.

== Religious festivals ==
=== Durga Puja ===
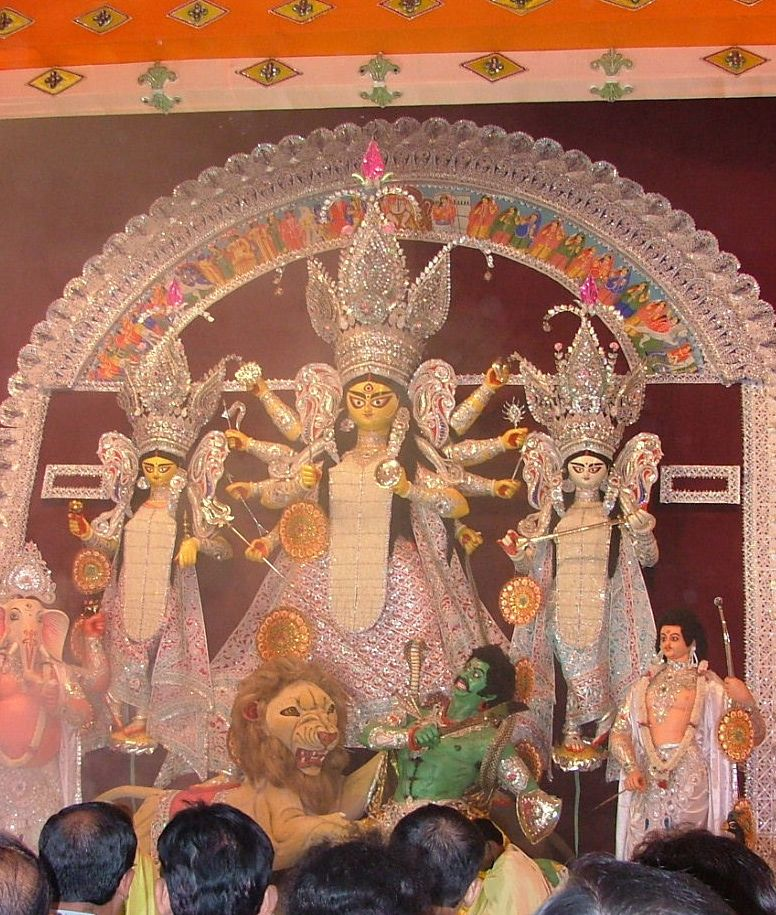
Traditional Durga

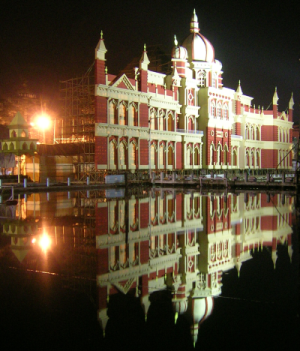
A Durga puja pandal

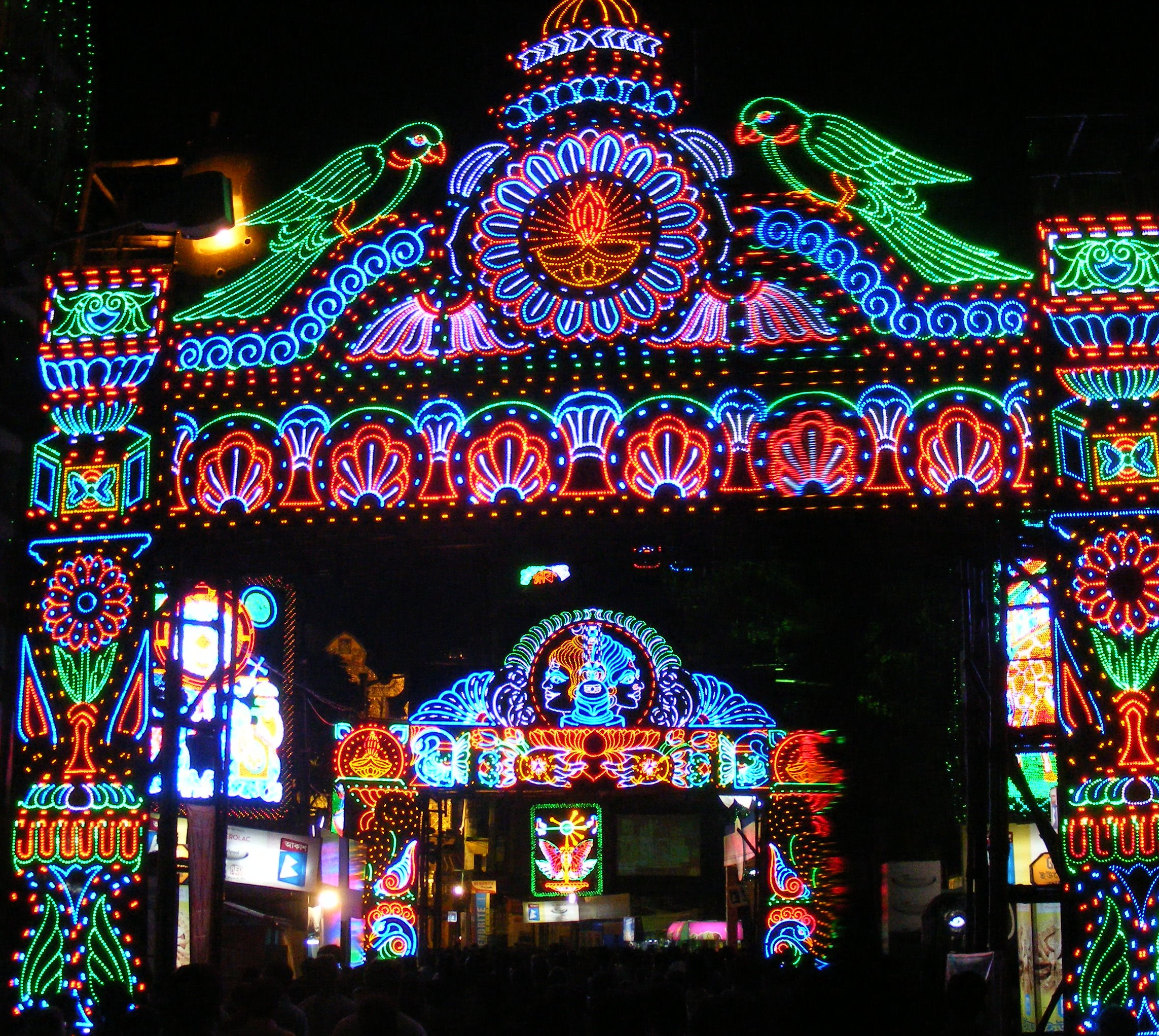
Characteristic neon light images glow as late night revellers throng the streets of Kolkata during Durga Puja.

Durga Puja, held in September–October, is the biggest and most important festival of West Bengal as well as of Kolkata. It marks the victory of ten-armed goddess Durga over the buffalo demon Mahishasur and signifies the victory of good over evil. The festival commences on Mahalaya, a week before the actual Puja celebrations begin on Sashthi and continue through Saptami, Ashtami, Navami and Vijaya Dashami, when the festival comes to an end. Pandals are set up and idols of goddess Durga and her four children - Lakshmi, Saraswati, Kartik, Ganesh are worshipped and displayed for five days across the state, especially in Kolkata. Some 3000 pandals are erected throughout Kolkata and its suburbs. Pujas are also conducted in sizeable number of family households. Elaborate rituals are performed by priests amid sound of drums (dhaak), conch shell (shaankh) and bells, and many devotees join in the prayers.

Although the root of Durga Puja is essentially religious, the festival has slowly changed into more of a social carnival than a religious festival, where people from other religious or ethnic backgrounds freely participate in the festivity. It has become Kolkata's biggest public spectacle, glamorous art event and consumerist carnival. The city is decked up with lighting decorations. Loudspeakers play popular songs as well as recitation of mantras by priests. Shops, restaurants and eateries stay open all night. Fairs are set up in numerous parks and public spaces. The roads become overcrowded with hundreds of thousands of devotees, revellers and pandal-hoppers visiting the pandals on Puja days. The number of crowd is estimated to be a few million on the festive days and nights, possibly the second largest annual human congregation after the Hajj. It creates a chaotic traffic condition and vehicular movement comes to a standstill in many places. Elaborate security arrangements are made by Kolkata Police and additional personnel are deployed to prevent any untoward incident as well as to maintain crowd movement. Trains, buses, taxis and other modes of transport operate for whole night as crowds pour into the city from nearby districts and towns.

The festival is celebrated with shopping and gift-giving - usually new clothes, family and other social gatherings, communal feasting and different cultural performances. Modern day Puja celebrations also include reading special Pujabarshiki magazines, going out for a tour, watching movies and special programmes on TV, preparing special food items or dining out during the Puja holidays.

On Bijaya Dashami, the day of the festival, people bid adieu to goddess Durga offering her sweets and sindoor. Before bidding adieu to the goddess, the married women assemble near the idol, apply vermilion on her feet or forehead and then smear vermillion on each other. This is a part of the last celebration before the idols are taken out in grand processions of song, dance, music and then immersed in the waters. The idol immersion ceremony continues for the next few days. People distribute sweets and visit their friends, family members and relatives to exchange the Bijoya greetings.

=== Kali Puja & Diwali ===
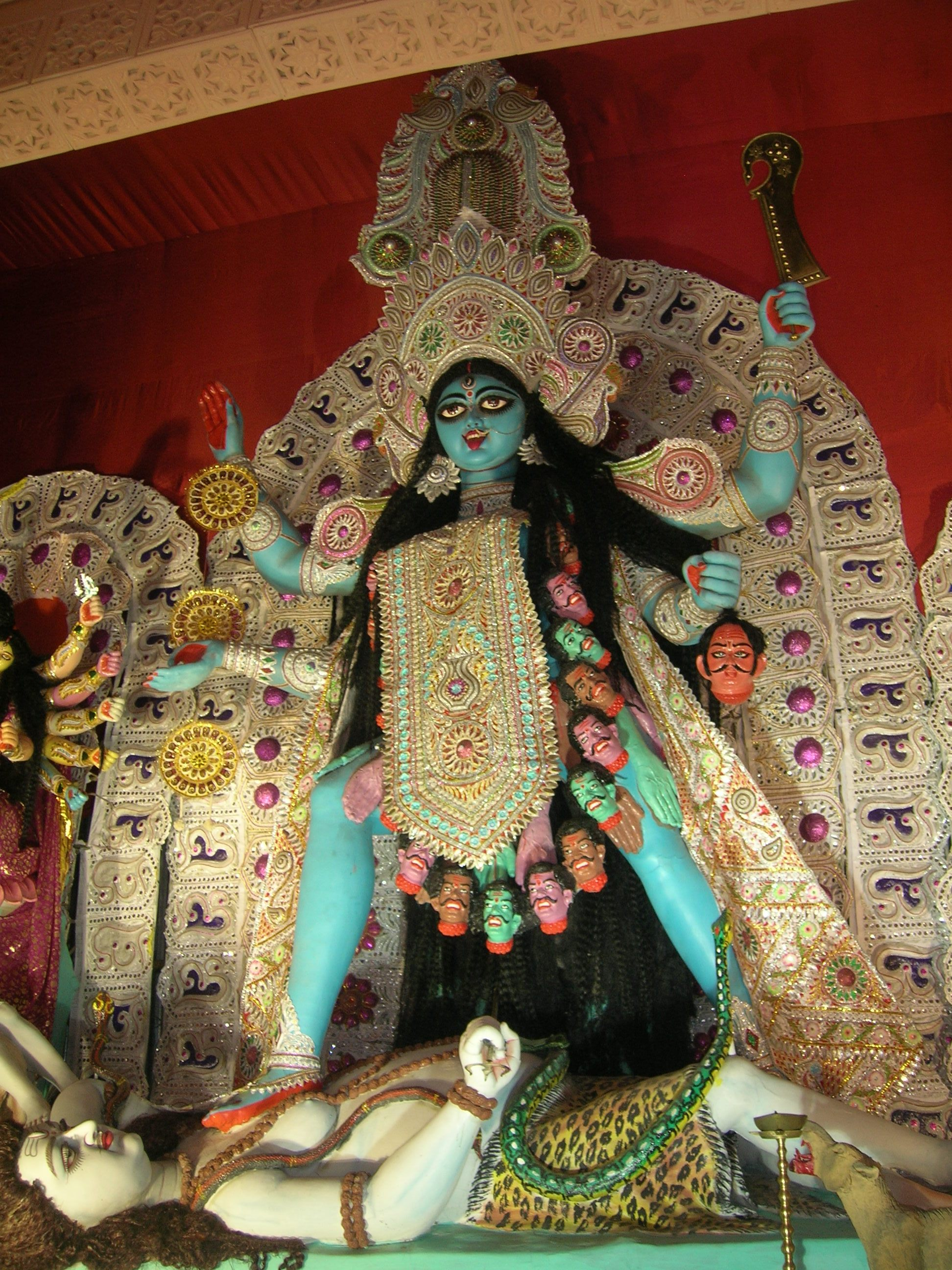
Kali Puja

Kali Puja which coincides with the North Indian festival of Diwali is a major festival of West Bengal, and probably the second largest after Durga Puja. Goddess Kali is worshipped at night in thousands of pandals, homes and temples. Kali Puja is light-up night for Bengal as well as for Kolkata. People decorate their homes with diyas, candles and lights and draw colourful rangolis on the floors of their homes. Children and adults burst firecrackers and burn sparklers throughout the night. A large number of devotees visit the temples to offer prayers to the goddess and animals, especially goats are sacrificed in some places. Two days after it is Bhai Phonta or Bhatri Dwitiya which is virtually the brother's day. On Bhai Phonta, the sisters fast in the morning till they put a mark of sandalwood paste on their brothers' foreheads and treat them with gifts and delicacies. While doing so, they pray to God for the sound health, safety and prosperity of their brothers. The brothers in return present gifts to the sisters.

=== Saraswati Puja ===
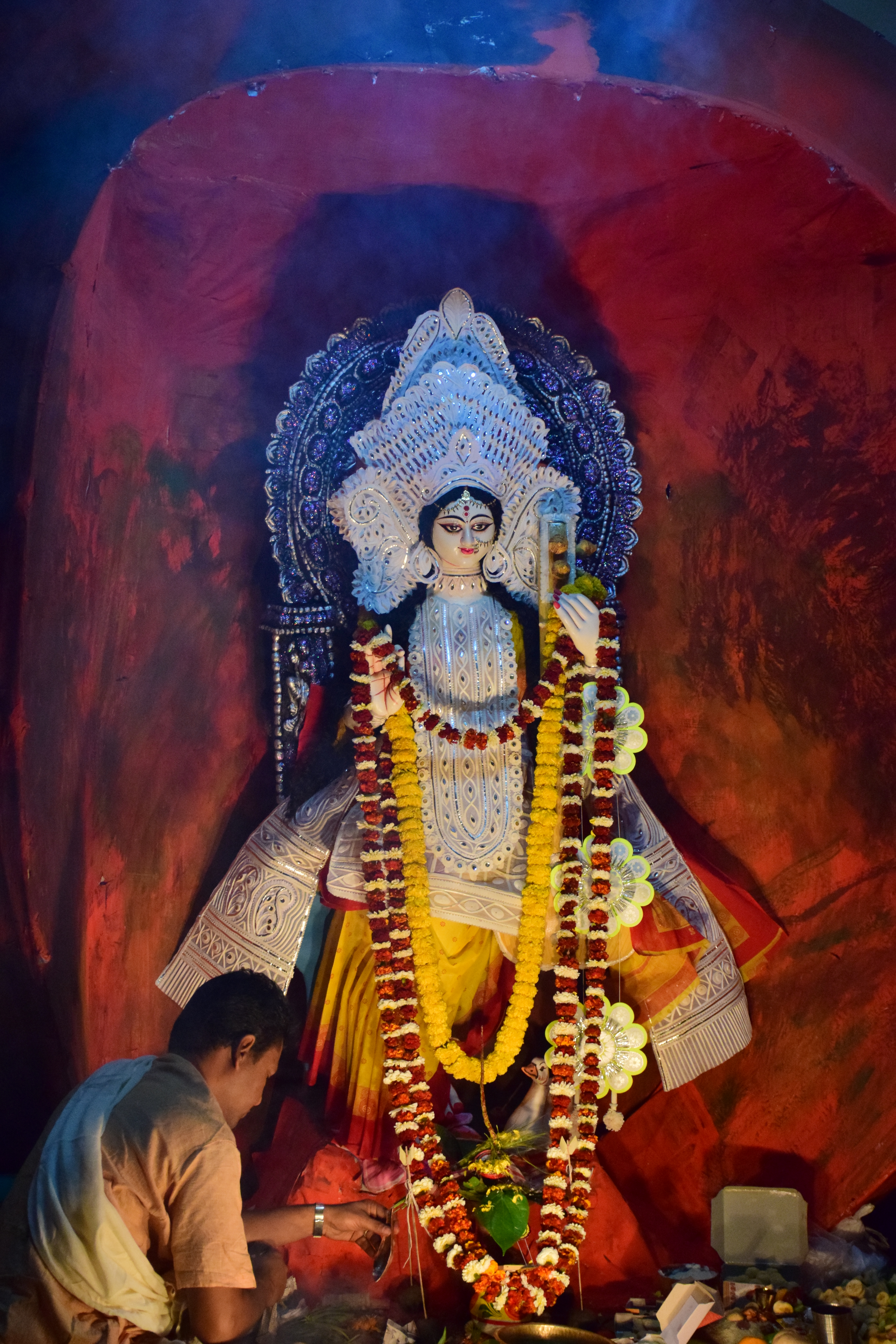
Idol of the goddess Saraswati being worshipped

Saraswati Puja, a festival honouring the goddess of learning and arts, is celebrated with domestic pujas, and familial gatherings in Kolkata on a date between the last week of January and the middle of February. The day is sacred to Saraswati, goddess of learning whose worship is celebrated with great splendor mainly by students and artists. Books are often worshipped in lieu of the clay image of the Goddess. Girl worshipers usually wear saffron and yellow-coloured cloths. The puja is especially celebrated in schools and other educational institutes. It gives an chance of free-mixing among school kids. This is the equivalent of Valentine's Day to them. The typical bhog which accompanies the Puja depends dramatically on whether the family is initially from West Bengal (or ghoti) or from East Bengal — now Bangladesh —(or bangal). Ghotis have vegetarian fare, while bangals offer paired Ilish fishes to the goddess and then consume it.

=== Dol Yatra ===
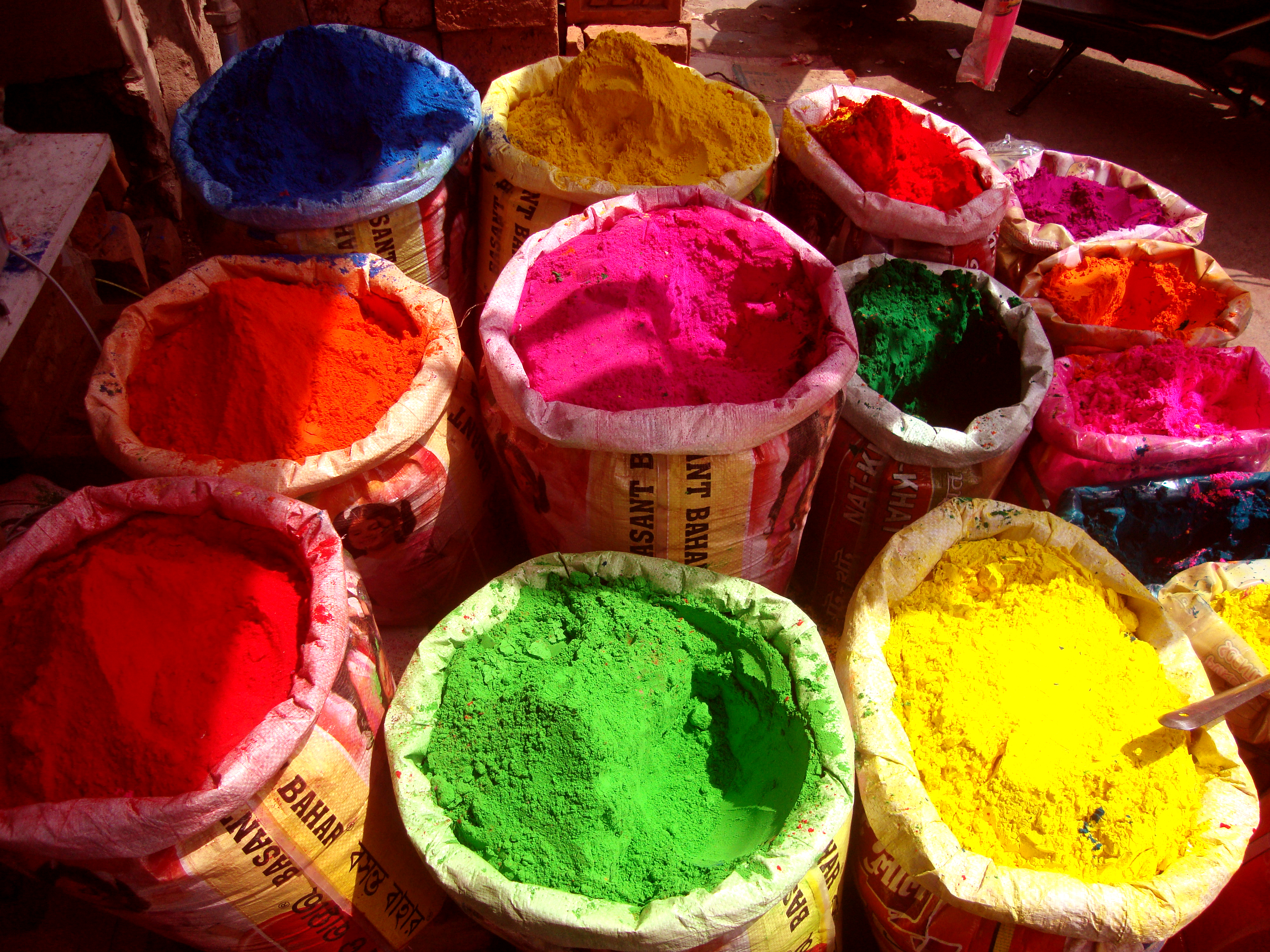
Holi colours on sale at a market in Kolkata

The North Indian festival of Holi, is celebrated, and is supposedly coincident with the advent of spring. Holi in Bengal is known as Dol Yatra but Holi is not a Dol Yatra locally known as the festival of colors. The celebrations start in the city with the burning of Holika bonfire on the night before Holi which is known as "Nera Pora" in local. In this occasion Lord Krishna and Goddess Radha is worshipped. It is also the auspicious birth Tithi of 16th-century Vaishnav Saint Sri Chaitanya Mahaprabhu. The festival of colours involves throwing, sprinkling and smearing powdered colour (aabir), and water colour (jal rang) on others. Passersby are often drenched by coloured water balloons, and celebrations often get rowdy and rambunctious, with the men partaking in the intoxicating drink of shiddhi (bhang), often laced with the stronger charas. Nowadays, a Holi party usually means frolicking dance and various delicacies like sweets and beverages.

== Cultural festivals ==
=== Dover Lane Music Festival ===
The Dover Lane Music Festival is a Hindustani classical music event, with performances from established musicians from several countries as well as new musicians. It has been held for the past years in the January conglomerate holiday (23 – 26 January) period and comprises three all-night recitals. Initially held open air at Dover Lane in Ballygunge area of South Kolkata, due to the large crowds, it is now held at the open-air theatre Nazrul Mancha on the Southern Avenue (Ballygunge area). It is held in conjunction with the Dover Lane Music Conference.

=== Calcutta Book Fair ===
The Kolkata International Book Fair or Kolkata Boi Mela is the world's largest non-trade annual book fair, as well as the largest book fair in Asia. Held on the Milan Mela ground near Science City on E.M. Bypass, this fair has over 600 stalls, selling over Rs.23,000,000 worth of books and attracting more than 2.5 million visitors annually. It was started in 1970 by the Publishers' and Booksellers' Association. It has a Monmarte with new poets and artists, and an annual theme country with authors like Günter Grass and Richard Dawkins visiting the fair as chief guests. It offers a typical fairground experience with a literary theme with picknickers, singer-songwriters, artistes and candyfloss vendors. It starts on the last Wednesday of January, and continues for twelve days, including two weekends.

=== Kolkata International Cinema Festival ===
The Kolkata International Cinema Festival is screened annually from 10 to 17 November. The largest of its kind in India, it was started in 1995 and is affiliated with the International Federation of Film Producers' Association (FIAPF) in Paris. Kolkata has strong ties to film-making (through such icons as Satyajit Ray, Mrinal Sen. More recently, Rituparno Ghosh) has boosted the festival. It screens a number of international, critically acclaimed new films every year.

=== National Theatre Festival ===
Nandikar's National Theatre Festival was initiated in 1984 to commemorate Nandikar's silver jubilee, and is now an annual event in Kolkata. The festival is organized by the Nandikar theatre group.

=== National Children's Theatre Festival ===
The National Theatre [Festival] is an annual event (first week of June) organised by Kolkata [Eso Natak Shikhi][www.esonatakshikhi.com], a Kolkata-based group theatre working with children since 1990. Teams from India and abroad participate and perform at Rabindra Sadan. The festival is assisted by the Ministry of Culture and Information, Government of West Bengal, and the Ministry of Transport & Sports, Government of West Bengal. Eastern Zonal Cultural Centre, Ministry of Tourism & Culture, Govt. of India.

=== International History & Heritage Exhibition ===
International History & Heritage Exhibition, also known as Itihaas Utsav (আন্তর্জাতিক ইতিহাস উৎসব) organised by Sabarna Sangrahashala, is an event held every February at Barisha. The four day long event displays rare artifacts, documents and information on the cultural heritage of Bengal, India and the World.

=== Kolkata International Dance Festival ===
The Kolkata International Dance Festival was established to promote Indian classical and folk dance forms among youth and beyond international boundaries. Started in 2016, it is one of the youngest cultural festivals in Kolkata. Hundreds of teams from India and abroad participate and perform. The festival is assisted by the Ministry of Culture Government of India and Bharatiya Vidya Bhavan. It is hosted in January. It was last hosted on 19 January 2024 as the 7th Kolkata International Dance Festival. Kolkata International Dance Festival also holdes the world record of 32.11 hours of nonstop Indian classical dance marathon which was set in September 2023, where more than 2000 dancers from around India and neighbouring countries performed Indian classical dance in this event.
