= Pola (festival) =

Agricultural festival of Maharashtra

- Status: Active
- Date: September
- Frequency: Yearly
- Locations: Maharashtra, Chhattisgarh, Madhya Pradesh
- Country: World
- Participants: Bulls, farmers and their families.
- Area: Rural Maharashtra Madhya Pradesh
- Major events: Washing of bulls, colour their horns, change old ropes tie new one, tie new bells, decorate them
- Members: Family of farmers

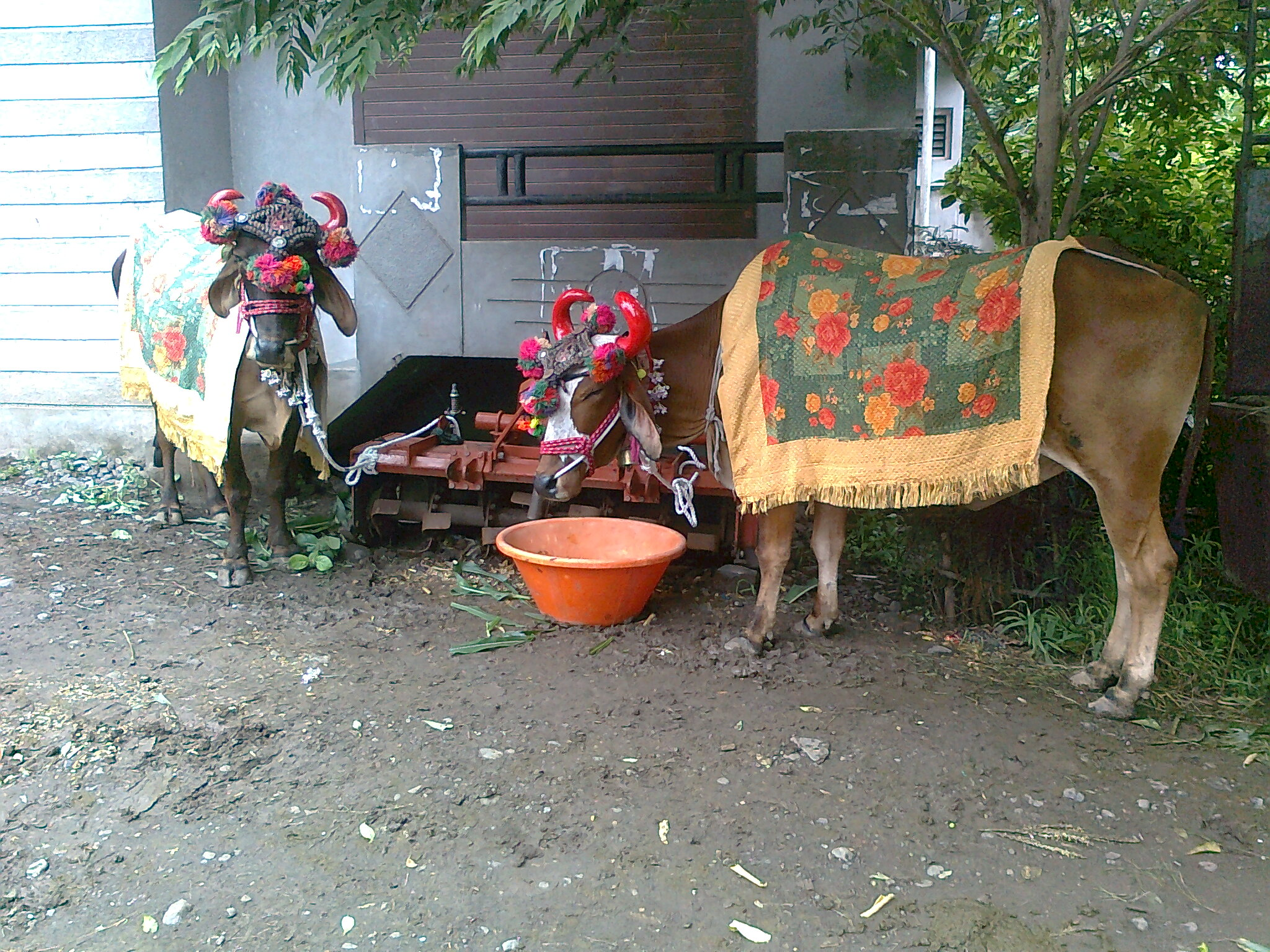
Pola in Chinawal

Pola (Marathi: पोळा), also known as Bailpola (Marathi: बैलपोळा), is a thanksgiving festival celebrated by farmers in Maharashtra and Chhattisgarh, to acknowledge the importance of bulls and oxen, who are a crucial part of agriculture and farming activities. It falls on the day of the Pithori Amavasya (the new moon day) in the month of Shraavana (usually in August). During Pola, farmers don't work their bulls in the farmland and the day is a school holiday in the rural parts of Maharashtra.

The festival is found among Marathas in central and eastern Maharashtra. A similar festival is observed by Farmers in other parts of India, and is called Mattu Pongal in south and Godhan in north and west India.

In Telangana, a similar festival is celebrated on full moon day and is called Eruvaka Purnima

== Celebrations ==
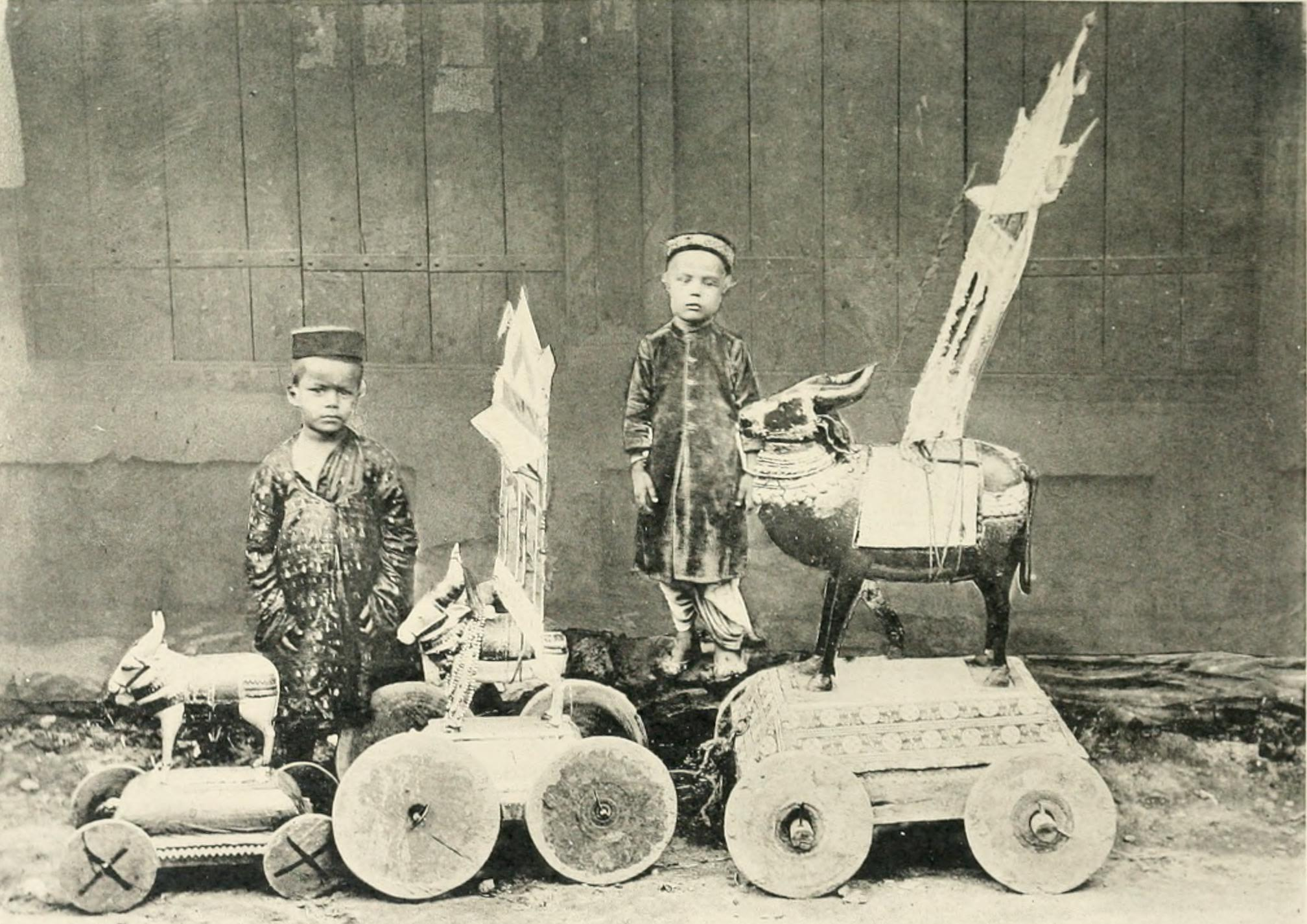
Children with Figures of animals made for Pola Festival, ca. 1916.

In preparation for the festival, bulls are washed and massaged with oils. They are decorated with shawls, bells, and flowers, their horns are coloured, and they get new reins and ropes. The decorated bulls and oxen are walked in procession to the village field accompanied by music and dancing. The first bullock to go out is an old bullock with a wooden frame (called makhar) tied on its horns. This bullock is made to break a toran, a rope of mango leaves stretched between two posts, and is followed by all the other cattle in the village.

Homes in the village are decorated with rangolis and toran on top of doors. Puja thalis with kumkum, water, and sweets are prepared, and when the cattle is returned from the procession they are formally greeted by family members, with an earthen lamp with ghee for puja and aarti.

On the following day, children decorate wooden bulls with beads and flowers.

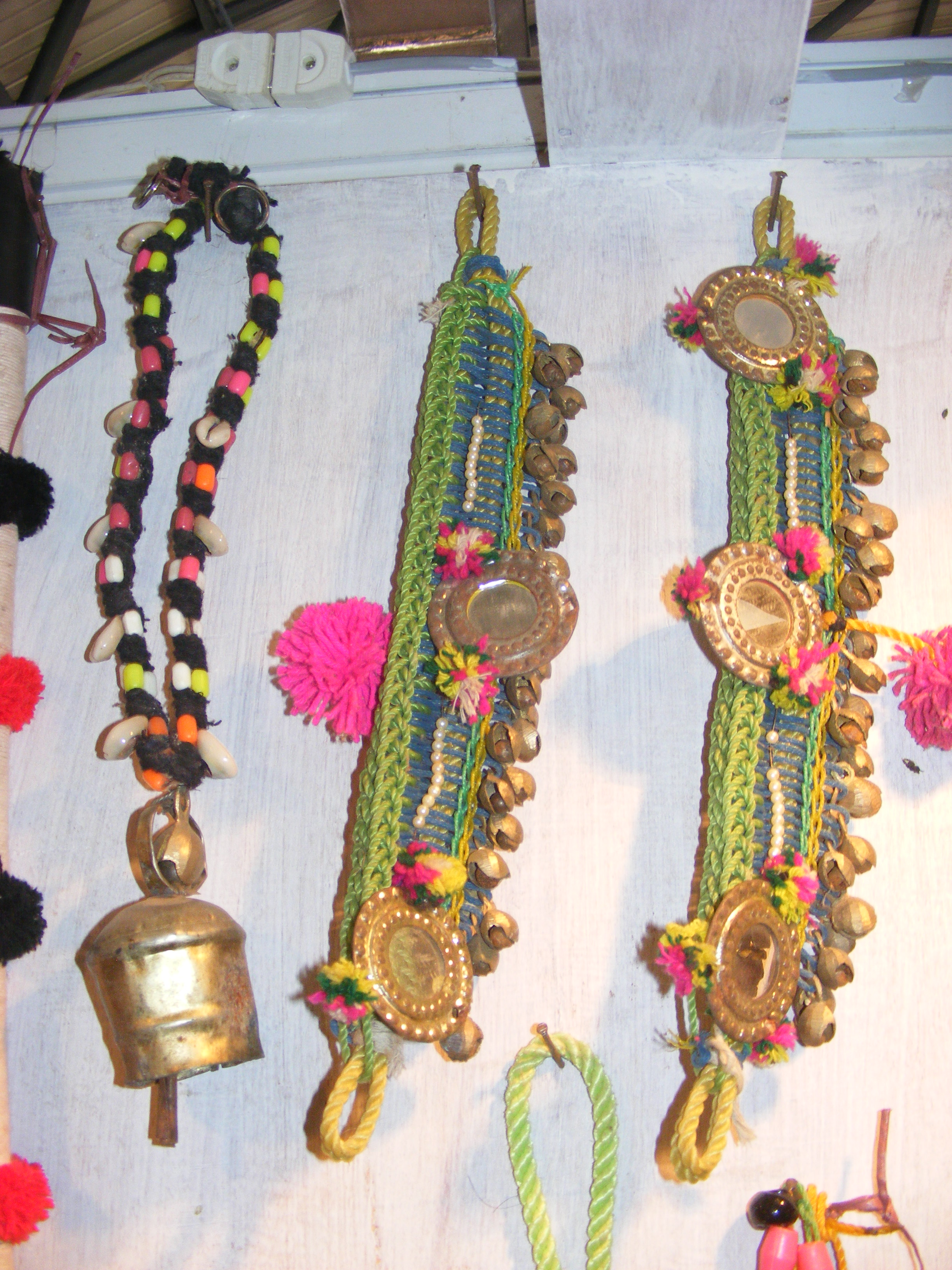
Ornaments for decorating cattle during pola.

On this day in Chhattisgarh, Lodhi Rajputs bring home-made sweets and dishes like thethri, khurmi, chakli to the homes of their sisters and daughters.
