= Narali Poornima =

Hindu festival dedicated to Varuna

Nārali Poornima
- Observed by: Hindus
- Frequency: Annual
- Related to: Varuna

Nārali Poornima is a ceremonial day observed by Hindu fishing communities in Maharashtra, India particularly around Mumbai and the Konkan coast. It is held on the full-moon day of the Hindu month of Shravan which falls around July or August. On this day offerings such as rice, flowers and coconuts as offered to Lord Varuna, the god of ocean and waters. Another ceremony involves women tying a rakhi or amulet on the wrists of their brothers.

== Celebration ==
During Narali Purnima, the devotees worship Lord Varuna. Devotees offer coconut to the Varuna and ask for his blessings. Devotees perform a puja for Varuna and ask for calm water and avoidance of natural water calamities. Upanayana is a popular ritual of Narali Purnima.
