= Padwa =

Village in Gujarat, India

Padwa or Padva is a village near the town Ghogha, the taluka Of Bhavnagar District in the Indian State of Gujarat. The village is located 10 km from the nearest town Ghogha. The main occupation of villagers is agriculture. Bhavnagar Energy Company Limited (BECL) is situated here. BECL is working on a 550 Megawatts power project in Padva village.
