= McKim Marriott =

American anthropologist (1924–2024)

- Born: February 1, 1924; St. Louis, Missouri
- Died: July 3, 2024 (aged 100)
- Education: Harvard University (BA) University of Chicago (PhD)
- Alma mater: University of Chicago
- Occupations: Private in the US Army; Researcher; Professor of Anthropology at the University of Chicago
- Years active: 1943-1945, 1950-1955, 1955-1988
- Known for: Contributions to Anthropology
- Notable work: Village India: Studies in the Little Community
- Title: Professor Emeritus of Anthropology at the University of Chicago
- Term: 1998-2024

McKim Marriott (February 1, 1924 – July 3, 2024) was an American anthropologist who specialized in Indian society, revolutionising the study of caste and South Asian studies.

== Background ==
Marriott was born on February 1, 1924. Growing up in St. Louis, Marriot attended Harvard University at the age of 17 in 1941, studying anthropology with Clyde Kluckhohn, alongside Japanese. During World War II, Marriot volunteered for the war effort at the age of 19 in 1943, and was enlisted at the rank of Private. Due to his knowledge of Japanese, Marriott was stationed in India, where he translated Japanese radio transmissions. Inspired by his time in India, Marriott continued his education at the University of Chicago, where he received a PhD from the University of Chicago in 1955 after performing 18 months of dissertation fieldwork from 1950–1952 in Uttar Pradesh on caste in post-Independence 'Village India'. Marriott turned 100 in February 2024, and died five months later on July 3.

== India Experience ==
His initial exposure to India came during World War II when he worked as a signals analyst. This experience sparked his interest in the country's unique social structures. Despite training as an Indologist, Marriott felt existing Western academic disciplines were inadequate for capturing the essence of Indian culture. Marriott's central work on India was his ethnographic research on rural India conducted post-Independence, which culminated in his seminal edited volume Village India: Studies in the Little Community. This edited volume contains eight chapters, by eight different authors, focusing on eight different rural indian villages. Marriott's chapter, Little Communities in an Indigenous Civilization, is an ethnographical account of his time in the village Kishan Garhi (Kiṣaṇ Gaṛhī) in Uttar Pradesh, in which he explored the following: '(1) can such a village be satisfactorily comprehended and conceived as a whole in itself, and (2) can understanding of one such village contribute to understanding of the greater culture and society in which the village is imbedded'. Marriot's findings not only deepened understandings of the Indian caste system, they highlighted the relationship between the village of Kishan Garhi and the 'Indian universe' through aspects of its social structure and through parts of its religious culture.

Alongside contributions to Social Anthropology in India, Marriott made contributions to the Anthropology of Religion and Secularism in India, with his research into Hinduism and caste highliting the need to utilise indigenous philosophical systems to accurately understand and explain social facts, emphasising that "the study of Indian thought could not be studied with non-Indian categories". Marriott studied villagers and urbanites of Asia and professionals of Asia, including Japan, Thailand, and other Asian states. He criticized Western categories which often present obstacles to understanding peoples, and he elaborated alternative models for studying differing cultural realities.

== Impact and recognition ==
Marriott's work influenced generations of anthropologists, including his students who went on to become prominent scholars themselves. He was celebrated for his dedication to cultural sensitivity and his ability to bridge the gap between Western and Indian perspectives. A felicitation ceremony at the University of Chicago Smart Museum marked his 90th birthday, where colleagues and former students acknowledged his lasting influence. He received the Quantrell Award.

== Selected publications ==
- 1955 Village India: Studies in the Little Community
- 1998 The female family core explored ethnosociologically. Contributions to Indian Sociology. 32: 279–304
- 1997 A Description of SAMSARA, A Realization of Rural Hindu Life. Chicago: McKim Marriott.
- 1992 Alternative social sciences. In J. MacAloon, ed., General Education in the Social Sciences. Chicago: University of Chicago Press, pp. 262–278.
- 1991 On ‘Constructing an Indian ethnosociology’ Contributions to Indian Sociology. 25:295-308.
- 1990 (Editor) India through Hindu Categories. New Delhi/Newbury Park/London: Sage Publications.
