= Aadi (month) =

- Native name: Ādi
- Calendar: Tamil calendar
- Month number: 4
- Number of days: 31 or 32
- Season: Mudhu-venil (summer)
- Gregorian equivalent: July–August
- Significant days: Aadi Amavasai; Aadi Perukku; Guru Purnima

Aadi is the fourth month of the Tamil calendar. The name of the month is derived from the position of the Moon near the Pooradam or Uthiradam nakshatra (star) on the pournami (full moon) day. The month corresponds to the end of the muthu-venil (summer) season and falls in July–August in the Gregorian calendar.

In the Hindu lunar calendar, it corresponds to the fourth month of Ashadha, falling in the Gregorian months of June–July.

In the Hindu solar calendar, it corresponds to the fourth month of Karkata and begins with the Sun's entry into Cancer.

In the Vaishnava calendar, it corresponds to the fourth month of Vamana.

== Festivals ==
The month is dedicated to Mariamman amongst the Tamils, and Aadi Amavasai, celebrated on Amavasya (new moon) of the month is an important festival. Aadi Perukku is celebrated on the 18th day of the month. The festival pays tribute to water's life-sustaining properties, and prayers to Hindu gods.

Guru Purnima, a festival dedicated to honoring the gurus (teachers), is celebrated on the Purnima (full moon) day of the month.

== See also ==
- Astronomical basis of the Hindu calendar
- Hindu astronomy
