= Purashcharana =

Hindu rite

Purashcharana (Sanskrit: पुरश्चरण, romanized: Puraścaraṇa) is a preliminary ritual action in Hinduism that is performed to master the mantra associated with a given god or goddess. It is a rite that generally comprises the panchanga (five components): japa (recitation of a mantra), tarpana (offerings for a deity's propitiation), abhisheka (consecration), homa (fire oblation), and brahmabhukti (offerings made to holy men). It refers to all the religious practices performed by a practitioner ahead of their acquisition of the shakti (power) of a mantra.
