= Kusha Amavasya =

Hindu festival for ancestral memory

Kusha Amavasya कुश अमावस्या
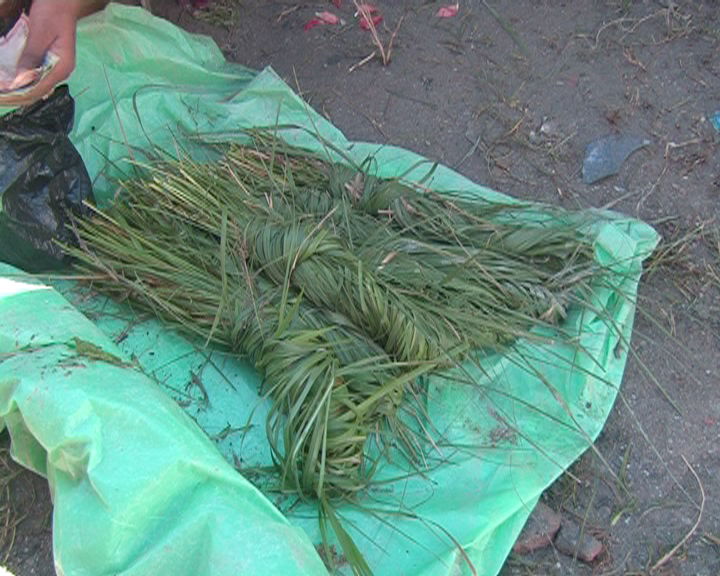
- Uprooted sacred Kusha grass during the Kusha Amavasya in Hinduism
- Nickname: Kushotpatini
- Genre: Hindu festival for uprooting sacred grass Kush
- Country: India and Nepal
- Most recent: 10 September 2026
- Participants: Adherents of Vedic tradition

Kusha Amavasya is a special Amavasya in the month of Bhadrapada in Hindu tradition. It is also known as Kushotpatini or Kushagrahani Amavasya or Pithori Amavasya. In the Mithila region, it is called Kushi Amavasya. On this day, the sacred grass Kush in Hinduism is uprooted and collected by adherents for religious functions, rituals, Karmakanda and Shraddha etc. performed throughout the year.

== Description ==
On the auspicious day of Kushi Amavasya the adherents after taking sacred bath go for uprooting Kushas in farm fields. Then charity, chanting of mantras, penance and fasting etc. throughout the day are performed. While plucking Kusha, some attentions are given that its leaves are not broken, Kush should not be broken with any weapon or iron and it should be broken with the right hand while facing towards the east or north direction.

Kush is an ordinary long and thin grass considered as sacred grass in the Vedic tradition. Kush is very important for religious, Vedic rituals, devine and ancestral rites like Shraadha and Pitripaksha. In Atharvaveda it has been described as anger calming and evil prevention. The tradition of uprooting ‘Kusha’ is called Kushotpatan which has been practiced and followed for centuries in the Mithila region. According to Panditas, before uprooting the sacred grass Kush, a Vedic mantra is chanted as

“kushagraha vaste rudra kush madhya tu keshwah kush mule vase brahma kushanme dehi medini"

The meaning of this mantra is related to the request with the earth. The Earth in the mantra is called as Medini, which is requested to grant the sacred grass Kush. According to the mantra Rudra resides at the tip, Lord Vishnu in the middle, and Lord Brahma at the root of the Kush.

And the mantra chanted during uprooting the Kusha is

“om hoon phat phat swaha”

Similarly another mantra chanted during uprooting the Kusha is

"viranchina sahotpanna parameshthinnisargaj, nud sarvani papani darbha swastikaro bhava"

After Bhadra Purnima this sacred Kusha is used in the oblations performed for the Vedic sage Agastya which marks the beginning of Pitrapaksha in Hinduism.
