= Dashama Vrata =

Annual Hindu festival

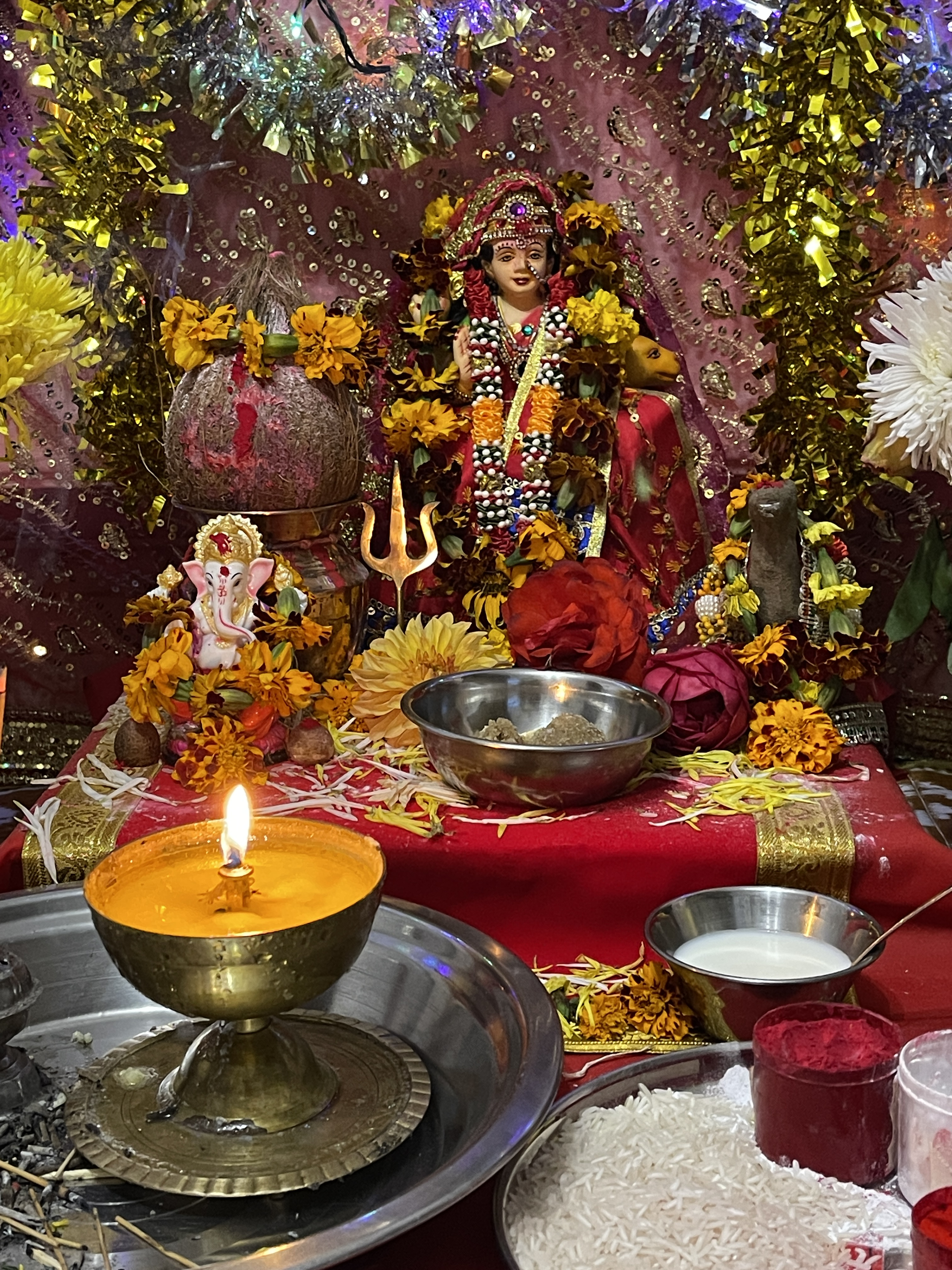
- Observed by: Hindus
- Type: Hindu
- Begins: Amavasya of Ashadha
- Ends: 10 days after
- Duration: 10 days
- Frequency: Annual

Dashama Vrata (Gujarati:દશામા વ્રત) is an annual 10-day Hindu festival or vrata (religious vow), mainly observed in the Indian state of Gujarat and Diu. This vrata is usually observed in July–August on the amavasya (new moon day) of the Hindu month of Ashadha. Many people also observe the vrata in the month of Chaitra (March). The vrata is dedicated to the goddess Dashama or Momai. The vrata is mainly observed by women for prosperity and good fortune of their family.

== Vrata ==
On the amavasya (new moon day) of the Hindu month of Ashadha, which is also known as Divaso (Diwaso). Devotees observe Dashama Vrata by installing a Sandhani made of raw soil in their home on a Bajot (prayer table). On top of the bajot, red cloth is layed out, the sandhani, made out of raw soil should be installed on the cloth. Devotees also install a murti (icon) or image of the goddess Dashama with an icon of the Hindu god Ganesha. On the bajot, a copper pot (kalash) is also placed with shriphal and mango tree leafs and it is worship with colored powders including abhil, gulal and kanku. This practice also includes taking Kautuka which has 10 knots and mixed with vermilion power, and it is placed on the kalash. Devotees who observe this vrata wear the 10 Kautuka (red-coloured thread) or sometimes 9 with 10th thread taking from their saree (for women) making it ten with 10 knots on their right hand on the first day and eat once a day (ek tanu). Daily, devotees perform puja (ritual worship), arti, reads the katha (legend) and then eats prasada (food offering). Devotees also participate in jagarana, a night vigil of prayer and worship. The vrata is observed for 10 days. On the last day, devotees observe the jagaran and around 4–5 AM, the murti is immersed into a water body like a river. The vrata is observed for 5 years. On the fifth year, the observer performs the ujavanu (the final completion ceremony), which typically includes inviting and feeding goranis (ritual female guests). As part of this concluding ritual, the observer is prescribed to make a Sandhani made out of silver and donate it to an auspicious Brahmin.

== Date ==
The dates of the vrata can vary as it is based on Gujarati Calendar of Vikram Samvat and observed on the amavasya of the Ashadha month. It is usually observed between July–August.

Year	Date
2018	12 August
2019	2 August
2020	21 July
2021	9 August
2022	28 July
2023	17 July/17 August
2024	4 August
2025	24 July
2026	12 August
2027	2 August
