= Dabhale =

Village in Maharashtra

- village
- Location in Maharashtra, India Dabhale (India)
- Coordinates: 19.8841494°N 72.783597°E
- Country: India
- State: Maharashtra
- District: Palghar
- Taluka: Dahanu
- Elevation: 15 m (49 ft)

Population (2011)
  - Total: 1,328
- Time zone: UTC+5:30 (IST)
- 2011 census code: 551737

Dabhale is a village in the Palghar district of Maharashtra, India. It is located in the Dahanu taluka.

The name Dabhale is derived from darbha, the Sanskrit word for a type of grass.

== Demographics ==
According to the 2011 census of India, Dabhale has 259 households. The effective literacy rate (i.e. the literacy rate of population excluding children aged 6 and below) is 52.19%.

Demographics (2011 Census)
	Total	Male	Female
Population	1328	677	651
Children aged below 6 years	211	109	102
Scheduled caste	0	0	0
Scheduled tribe	1268	646	622
Literates	583	364	219
Workers (all)	656	386	270
Main workers (total)	438	284	154
Main workers: Cultivators	28	17	11
Main workers: Agricultural labourers	273	163	110
Main workers: Household industry workers	4	3	1
Main workers: Other	133	101	32
Marginal workers (total)	218	102	116
Marginal workers: Cultivators	59	30	29
Marginal workers: Agricultural labourers	103	39	64
Marginal workers: Household industry workers	13	6	7
Marginal workers: Others	43	27	16
Non-workers	672	291	381
