= Lunar phase (disambiguation) =

Lunar phase refers to the shape of the moon's sunlit portion as viewed from Earth.

Lunar phase may also refer to:

- Lunar Phase is a 2025 album by American rock band, Deep Blue Something
- Lunar phase (Hinduism) - the religious significance of each lunar phase in Hindusism

== See also ==
- Dark Side of the Moon - album by British rock group Pink Floyd
