= Aadi Perukku =

Tamil cultural festival

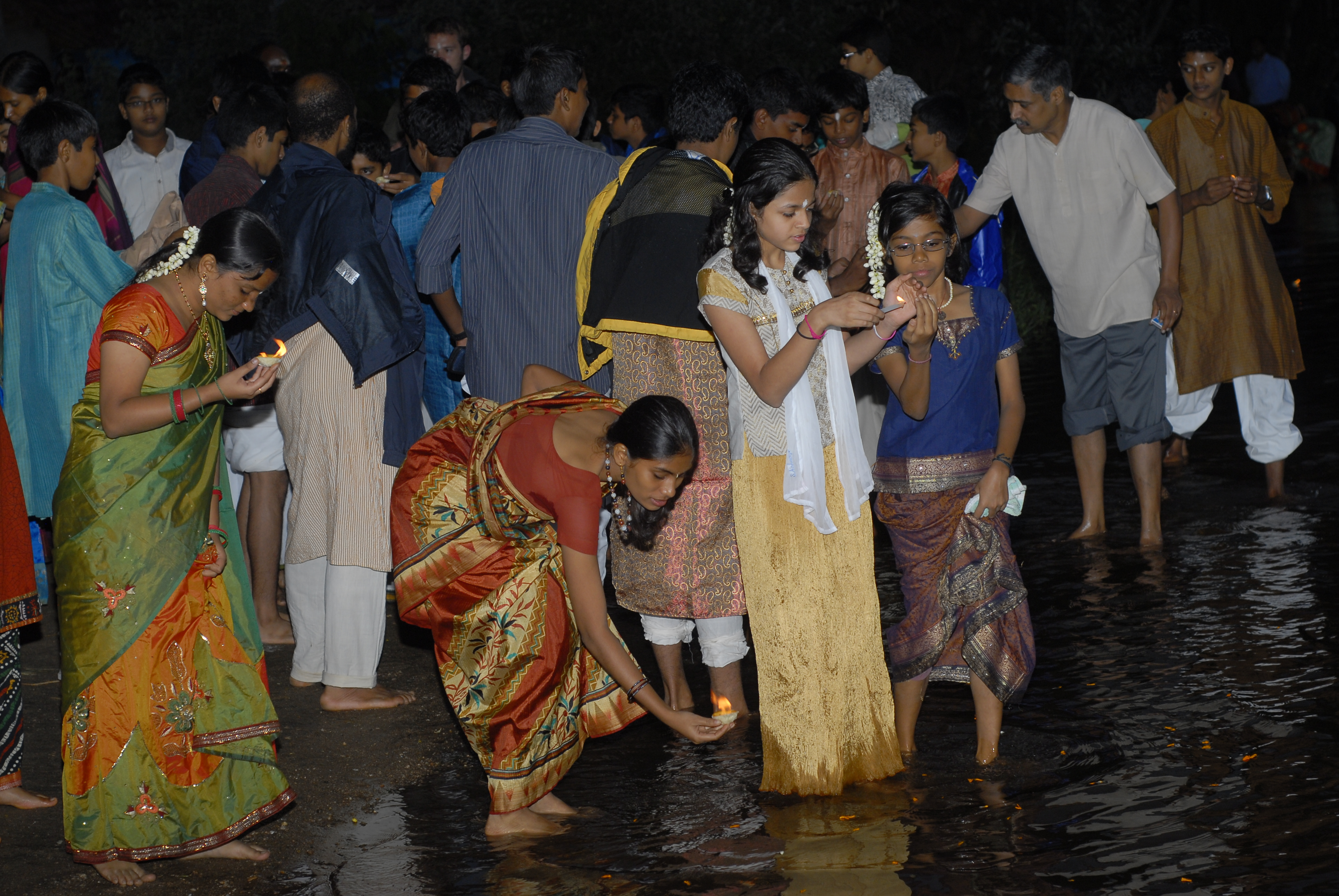
- Aadi Perukku celebrations in Kaveri river
- Also called: Aadi Pathinettu; Aadi Nombi; Pathinettam Perukku
- Observed by: Tamils
- Type: Hindu
- Significance: Welcoming increasing river levels during monsoon
- Observances: Amman worship, offering to rivers, rituals
- Date: 18th day of Aadi
- Frequency: annual

Aadi Perukku, is a Hindu festival celebrated by the Tamils on the 18th day of the Tamil month of Aadi. The festival usually involves prayers on river banks to mark the increasing water levels during the monsoon and as a tribute to the life-sustaining properties of water. Hindu deity of Amman is worshiped with various rituals.

== Significance ==
The Aadi Perukku is a Hindu festival is celebrated on the 18th day of Aadi, the fifth month of the Tamil calendar. It is also called as Pathinettam Perukku, and is the only Tamil festival celebrated strictly based on the date rather than the star or weekday. In the Kongu Nadu region of Western Tamil Nadu, it is locally known as Aadi Nombi with 'Nombi' meaning festival. References to the festival are found in Silappathikaram, and other Sangam literature. The festival marks the arrival of the rains, and increasing water levels in the rivers and water bodies during the monsoon season. The rising water levels and flooding symbolises prosperity and agricultural abundance, with farmers beginning to sow seeds on the day.

== Worship and rituals ==
On this day, people take holy baths in rivers and water bodies, especially the Kaveri river, and worship Amman. As per Hindu mythology, worshipping the Saptha Kanniyar on the day helps fulfills one’s wishes. Young unmarried women seek blessings from the goddess for finding a suitable life partner. Married women often change their thaali (sacred thread) on this day, believing that Amman blesses women with marital happiness and longevity of their husbands. Married women do a symbolic baby shower ceremony for the goddess, and pray for her blessings to grant them with children. People exchange sweets and offer rice, turmeric, and flowers as offerings to the rivers and water bodies, and light oil lamps, to thank and honor the river as a life-giving deity. Temporary swings called 'thooris' are tied using ropes or saris on trees, and ceilings of the house.
