= Kakkada =

Monsoon month in Kodava calendar

Kakkada is a month in the Kodava calendar falling between 17 July and 16 August during the monsoon season. Kakkada is nothing but Ashada of the Kannadigas, Aati of the Tuluvas and Aadi of the Tamils.

== Festivals ==
Kakkada Padinett, literally translates as 18th day of the Kakkada month in the Kodava calendar in Kodagu, is considered one of the significant and auspicious days. They prepare cakes and sweet porridge made from the essence of madd toppu or aati soppu, a wild aromatic herb Justicia Wynaadensis. They are plucked and soaked (or boiled) in water to extract the aromatic juice, which is thick and dark violet in colour. It has been believed that the wild herb's leaves contain 18 varieties of herbal medicine as the plants emit a sweet aroma only on that day. surprisingly, this unique aroma that is not found on the plants prior to or after the 18th day.

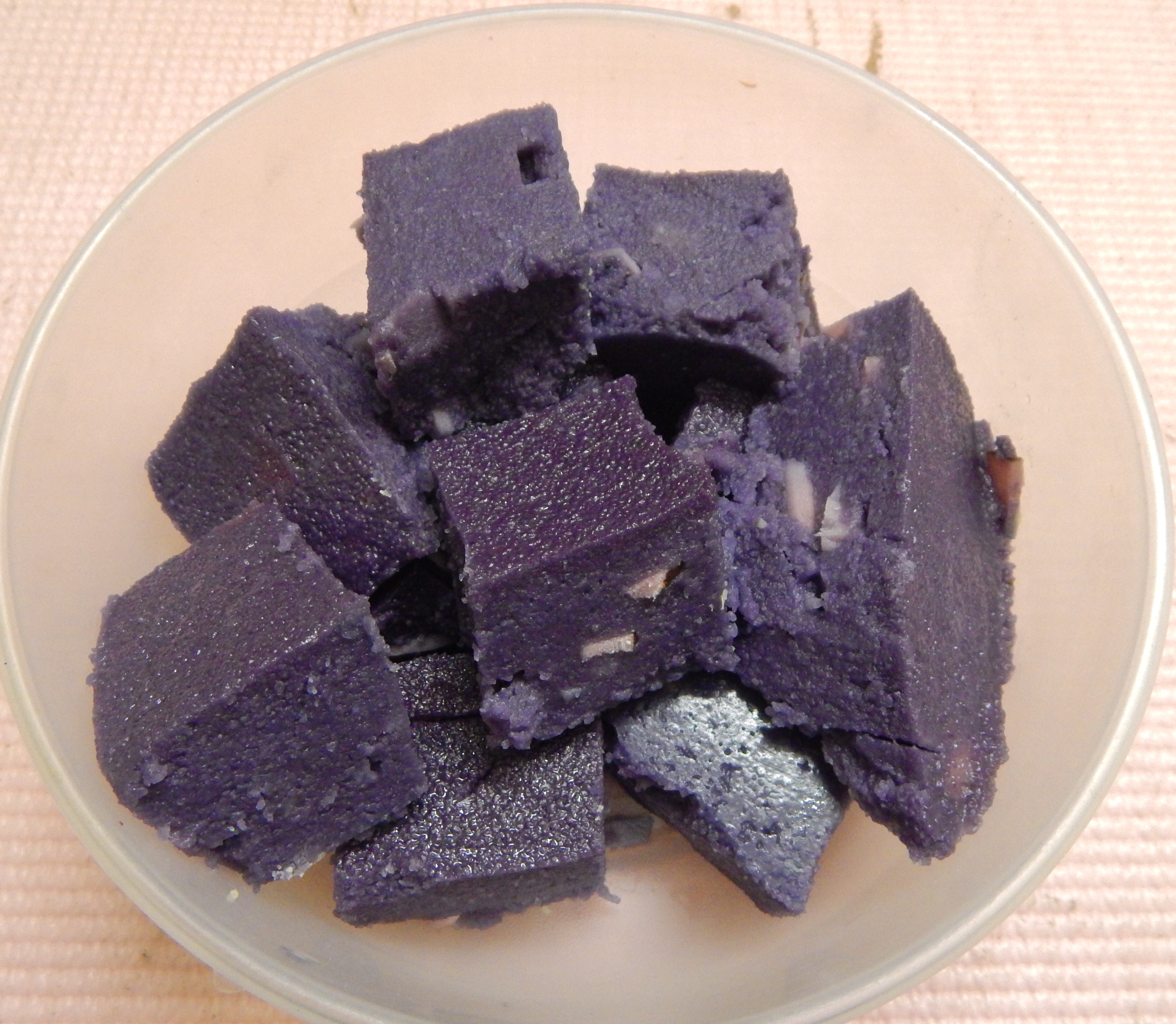
Sweet cake prepared during kakkada from maddu soppu
