= Momaymora =

Village

Momaymora or Momaimora village is located in Rapar Tehsil of Kutch district in Gujarat, India. It is situated 31 km away from taluka headquarter Rapar and 175 km away from district headquarter Bhuj. Pin code of village is 370445. The village gets its name from temple of Goddess Momai, whose chief temple is located in village and one of pilgrimage site of Kutch, where fair is held in Navratri
