= Kusha grass =

Sanskrit terms for Desmostachya bipinnata

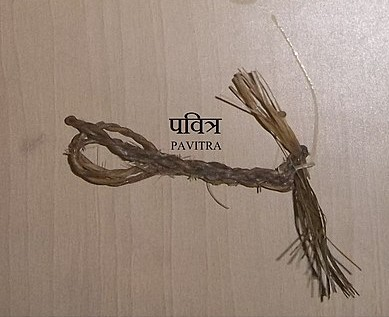
Image of pavitram grass used in a tarpana.

Kusha (Sanskrit: कुश), darbha (Sanskrit: दर्भ) and pavitram (Sanskrit: पवित्रम्) are the Sanskrit terms for Desmostachya bipinnata grass. This grass is of literary and ritual significance in Hinduism.

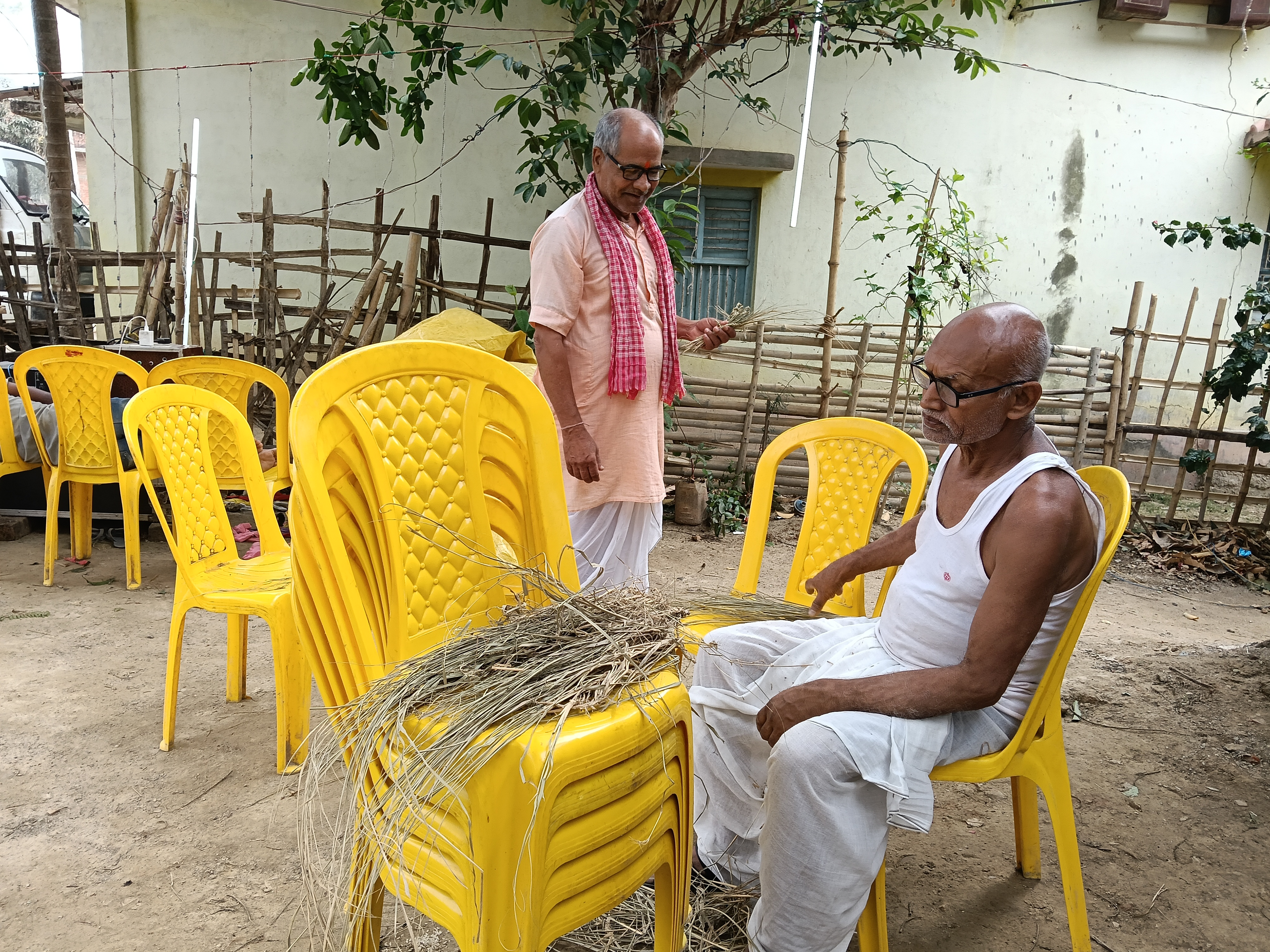
Preparation of Kusha by Maithil Brahmins for the rituals of Maithil Upanayan at Basuki Bihari.

In the performance of Vedic rituals such as the homa and tarpana, the kusha grass is shaped like a ring and is worn by a priest on the ring finger of his right hand. The auspicious day for uprooting the sacred grass Kusha is the amavasya day of Bhadrapada month in Hinduism called as Kusha Amavasya.

== Literature ==
The Rigveda prescribes the sprinkling of soma juice upon kusha grass in the performance of a rite.

Chapter 6 of the Bhagavad Gita contains the prescription to use kusha grass along with deerskin and cloth in the ideal seat of meditation.

The Garuda Purana states that the kusha grass is born of the hair of Vishnu, and that it offers residence to the essence of all three of the Trimurti. It is among the many substances that is declared to be impossible to become impure despite frequent usage.

The Bhagavata Purana features a legend from the Uttara Kanda in which Sita does not leave behind her son Lava in Valmiki's hermitage as she usually does while going out. The sage observes the boy's absence, and concludes that some animal had carried him away. Believing that Sita would not be able to bear the loss of her son, Valmiki creates an identical son from kusha grass and places him on Lava's cot. When the bewildered Sita noticed Lava's doppelganger, the sage explains what he had done, and she decides to raise the boy as Lava's twin, and names him Kusha.

The Varaha Purana describes one of the seven continents of the earth named kushadvipa, surrounded by the ocean of milk and containing seven mountains.
