= Amavasya =

Lunar phase near new moon

Amavasya Amāvásyā
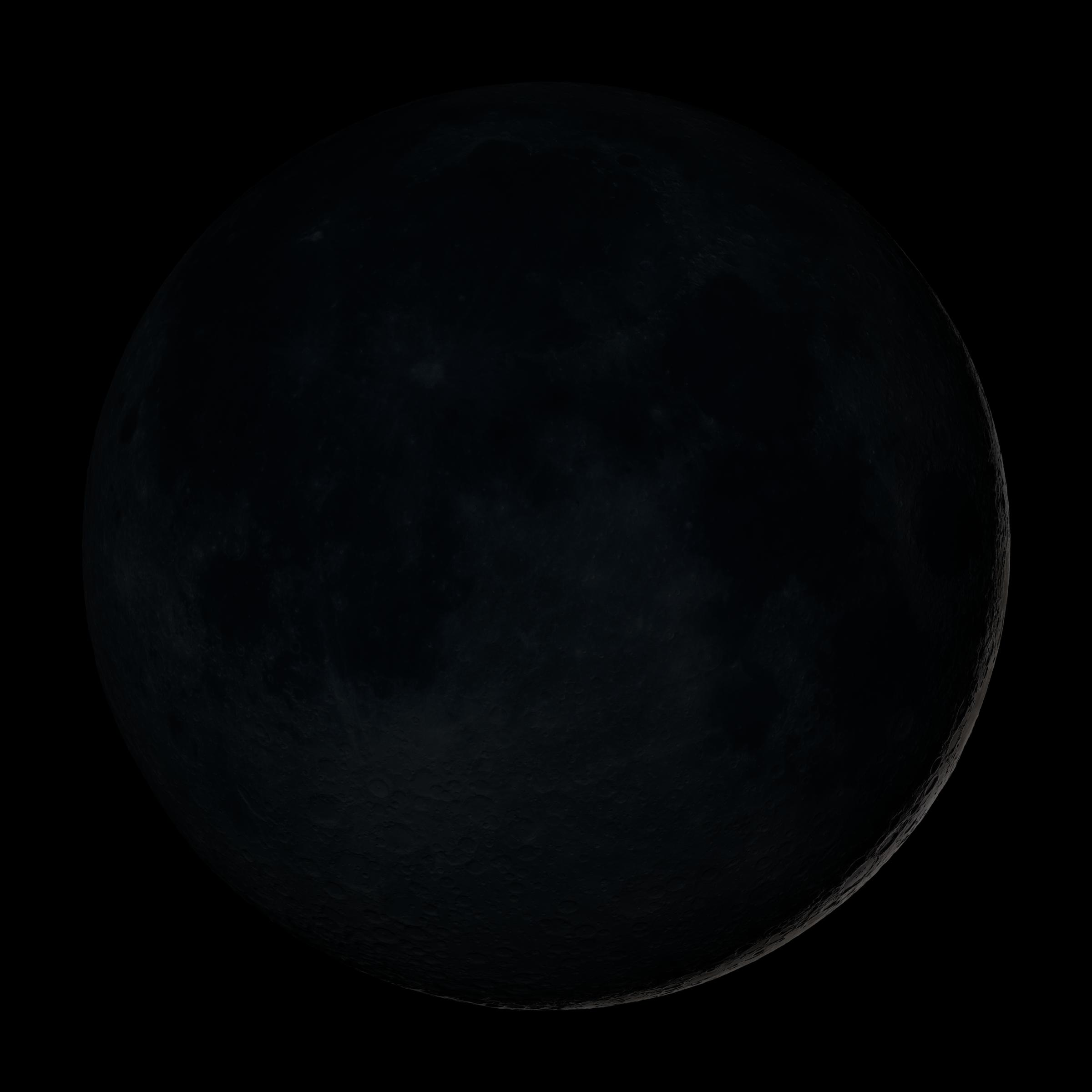
- Simulated image of new moon
- Genre: Natural phenomena
- Frequency: Monthly

Amavasya (Amāvásyā) represents the lunar phase of new moon in the Hindu calendar. A calendar month ends on amavasya as per the amanta tradition of the Hindu lunar calendar. (Note: The Hindu calendar follows two various systems:Amanta and Purnimanta. As per the amanta tradition, the lunar month ends on the new moon day and as per the purnimanta tradition, it ends on the full moon day. As a consequence, in the amanta tradition, Shukla paksha (waning moon) precedes Krishna paksha (waxing moon) in every lunar month, whereas the reverse happens in purnimānta tradition. Hence, Shukla paksha will always belong to the same month in both traditions, whereas Krishna paksha will always be associated with different but succeeding months in each tradition. The Amanta tradition is officially followed by the Indian national calendar.) Various Hindu beliefs and rituals are associated with the day. Hindu festivals including Diwali are celebrated on the amavasya day of various months.

== Etymology ==
Amavasya is derived from Sanskrit words amā meaning "together" and vásya meaning "to dwell" or "cohabit", implying the conjunction of the Sun and the Moon in the same ecliptic longitude. It can also be interpreted as "no-moon day", derived from na + ma + asya ("no" + "moon" + "there"), referring to the lunar phase when the Moon is not visible from the Earth.

== Description ==
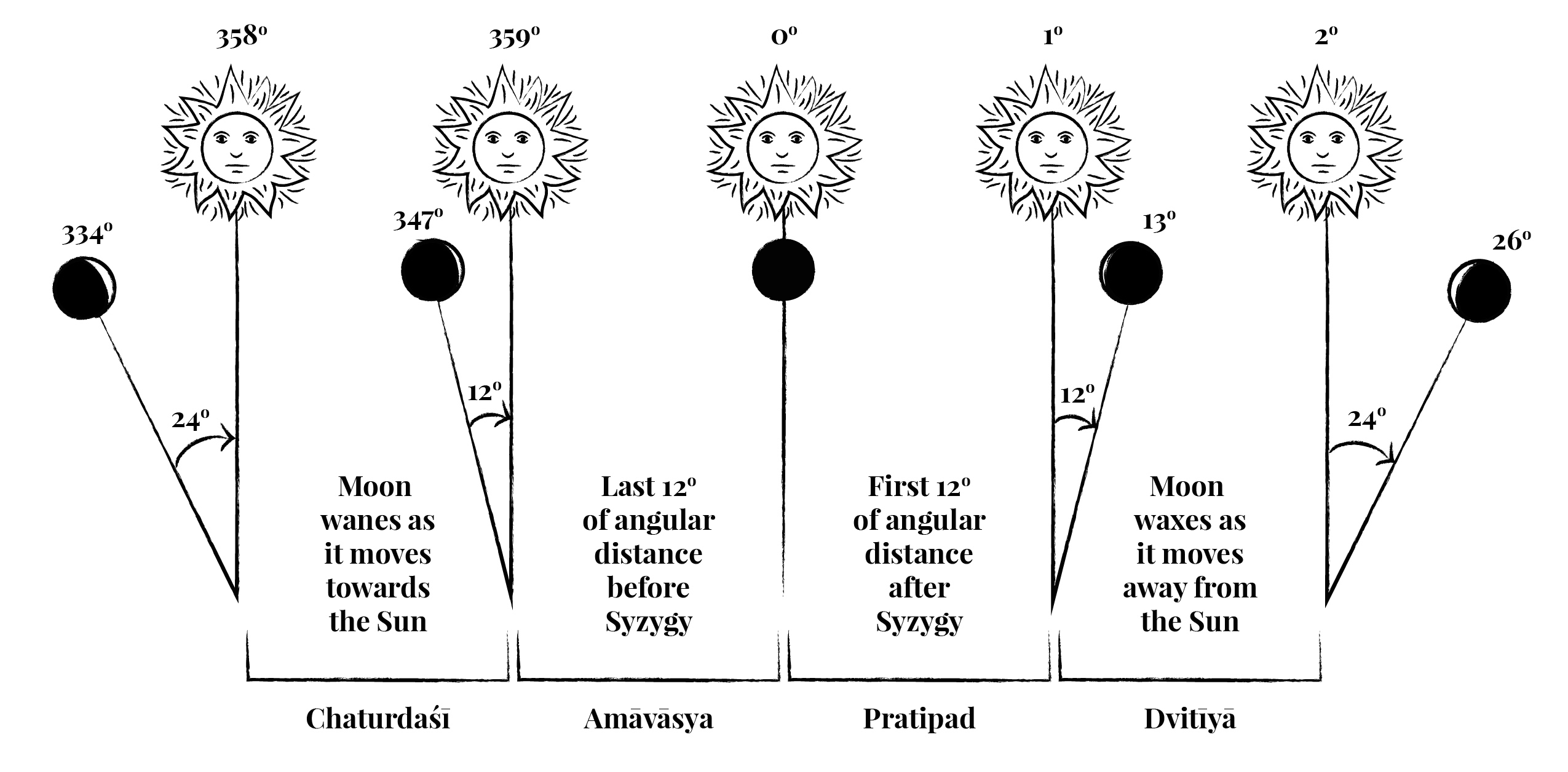
Amavasya and Prathama tithi

In the Hindu lunar calendar, each month has 29 or 30 days. The month begins on the next day after Amavasya (new moon) or Purnima (full moon) in the amanta and purnimanta systems respectively. The amanta system is followed majorly in the South India and the purnimanta system in North India. A month consists of two cycles– Shukla Paksha (waning moon) and Krishna Paksha (waxing moon), consisting of 15 days each. Days in each cycle is labeled as a thithi, with each thithi representing the different phases of the moon and repeating twice in a month. Amavasya corresponds to the period when the Moon is within 12 degrees of angular distance from the Sun before their conjunction.

== Tradition and beliefs ==
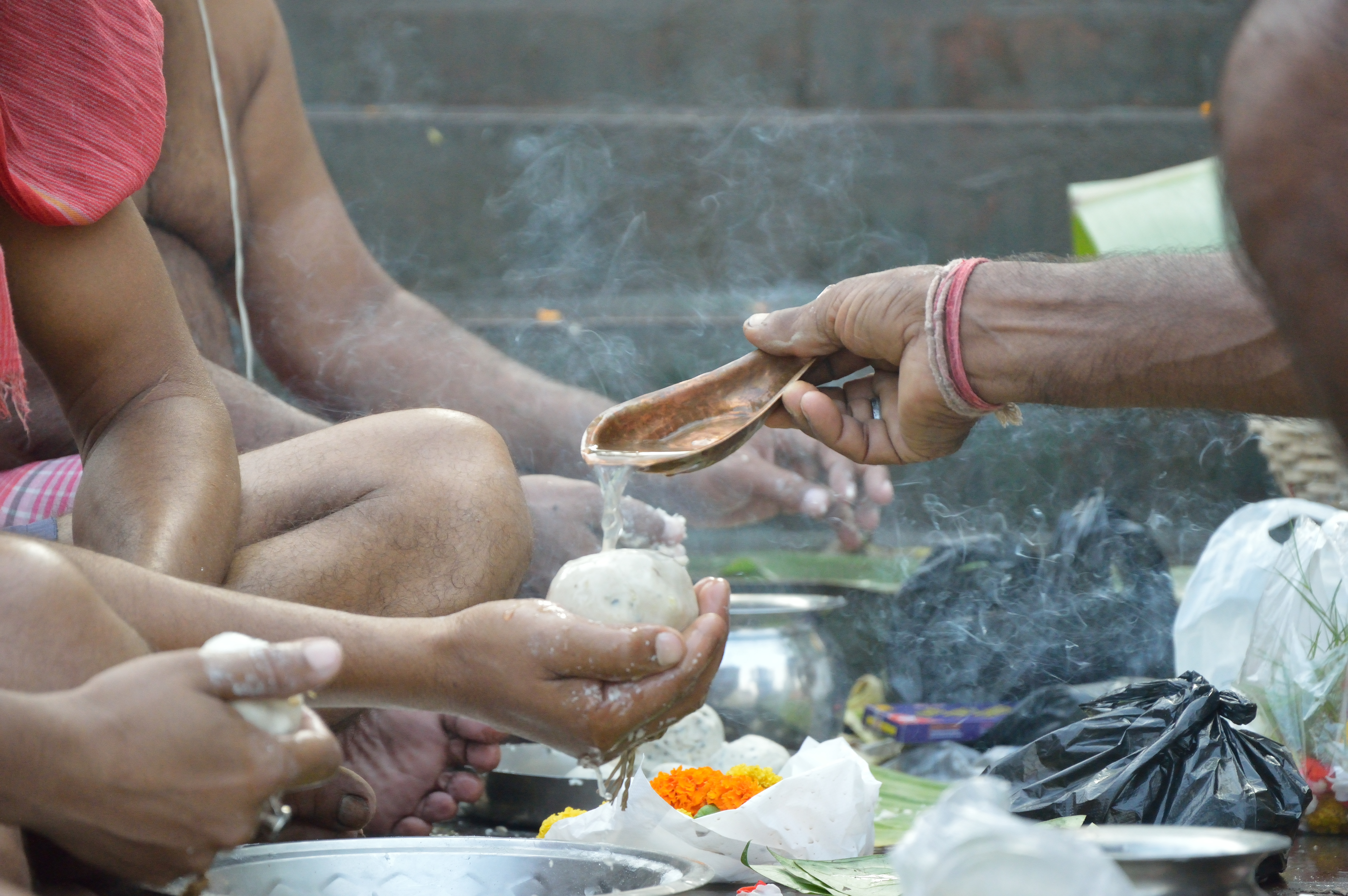
Worship of ancestors during Pitru Paksha

In Hindu culture, Amavasya day is considered a time of significance to propitiate the Sun, the Moon and other Gods. People observe fasting on the day, with the belief that all desires could be fulfilled if one fasts on this Amavasya. When the new moon day falls on a Monday, it is observed as Somvati Amavasya. Married women observe fast and pray to lord Shiva for the well-being of their husbands.

Amavasya is particularly associated with worship of ancestors (pitrs). People take holy dips in rivers and perform special pujas. It is considered the time to perform rituals (Śrāddha) to the ancestors. Memorial rituals such as tarpana, and offering of pinda (cooked rice and flour balls mixed with ghee and black sesame seeds) are performed for the oblation of the departed souls of the forefathers.

The dark fortnight (Krishna Paksha) of the month of Bhadrapada is known as Pitru Paksha and is reserved for the veneration of the dead. The period ends on the Mahalaya Amavasya day, on which Hindus pay homage to their ancestors through special offerings. As per Hindu scriptures, it has been ordained that offerings made during this period benefit all the departed souls with the grace of Yama. Kush Amavasya is observed on the same amavasya day of the month of Bhadrapada, during which people collect the sacred Kusha grass which is used in various Hindu rituals. In Southern state of Tamil Nadu, people perform rituals on Aadi Amavasai, which falls in the Tamil month of Aadi (July–August) and Thai Amavasai, which falls in the month of Thai (January–February).

== Festivals ==
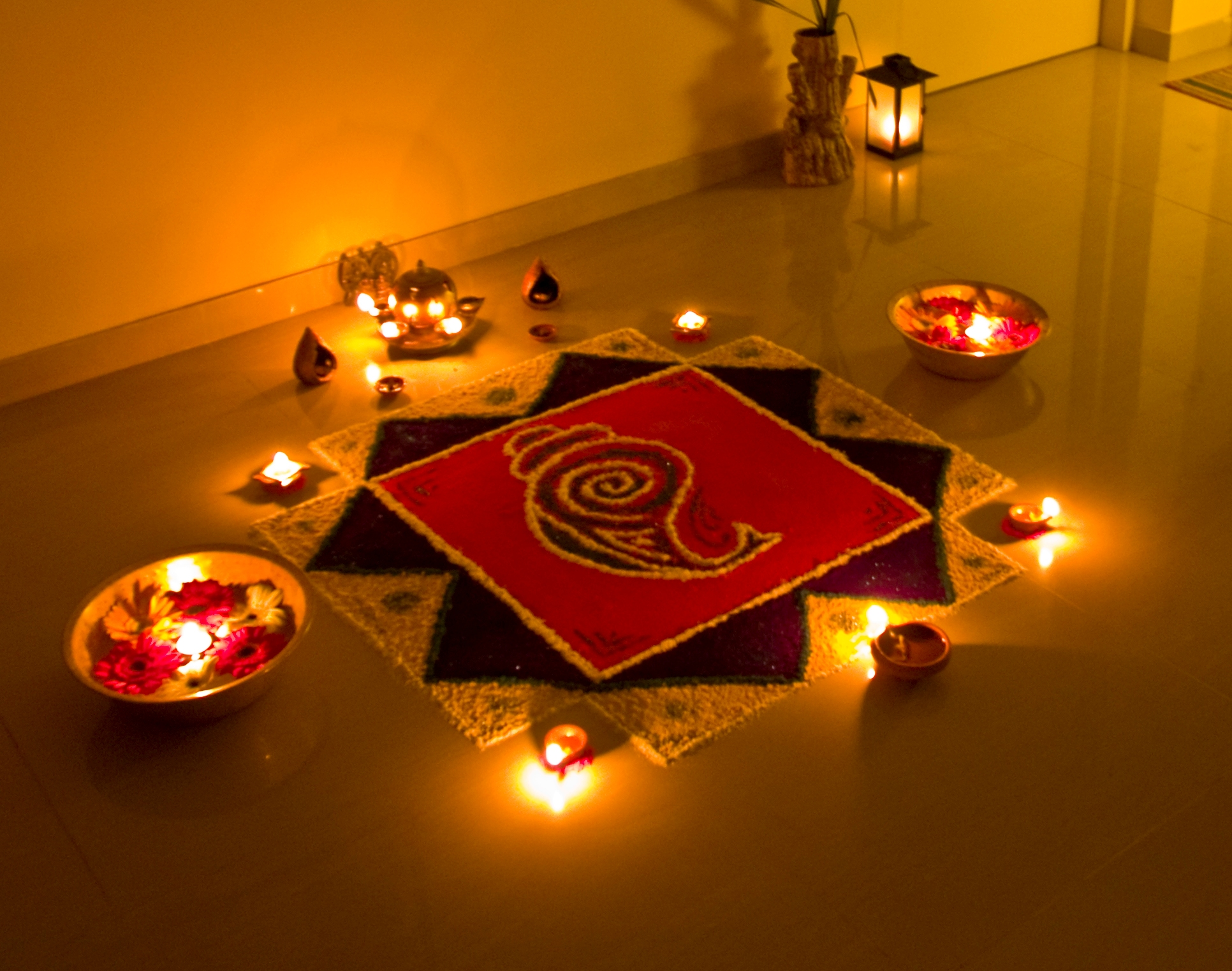
Lakshmi Puja, celebrated on the Amavasya of the month of Ashvin marks the important day of Diwali celebrations

Diwali is a five‑day Hindu festival of lights marking the victory of light over darkness, or good over evil. Lakshmi Puja, celebrated on the Amavasya of the month of Ashvin marks the important day of Diwali celebrations. It is dedicated to welcoming prosperity by worshipping Lakshmi, the Hindu goddess of wealth, and Ganesha, the foremost god. People light lamps (diyas), burst crackers, and do pujas.

Shani Jayanti is celebrated on Amavasya of the month of Jyeshtha. It is dedicated to Shani (Saturn), one of the navagrahas. In Gujarat, Dashama Vrata, dedicated to Momai, is observed on the Amavasya of the month of Ashadha. Sohrai is a harvest festival celebrated by tribal communities in Jharkhand and West Bengal. Observed on Amavasya of the month of Kartika, it honours cattle, agricultural land and involves paying tribute to the ancestors, and community feasting. Homes are cleaned and decorated, livestock bathed and offered special meals, and the walls of houses are adorned with Sohrai art.

== See also ==
- Hindu astronomy
- Hindu units of measurement
- Jyotish
