= Momai =

Regional Hindu goddess

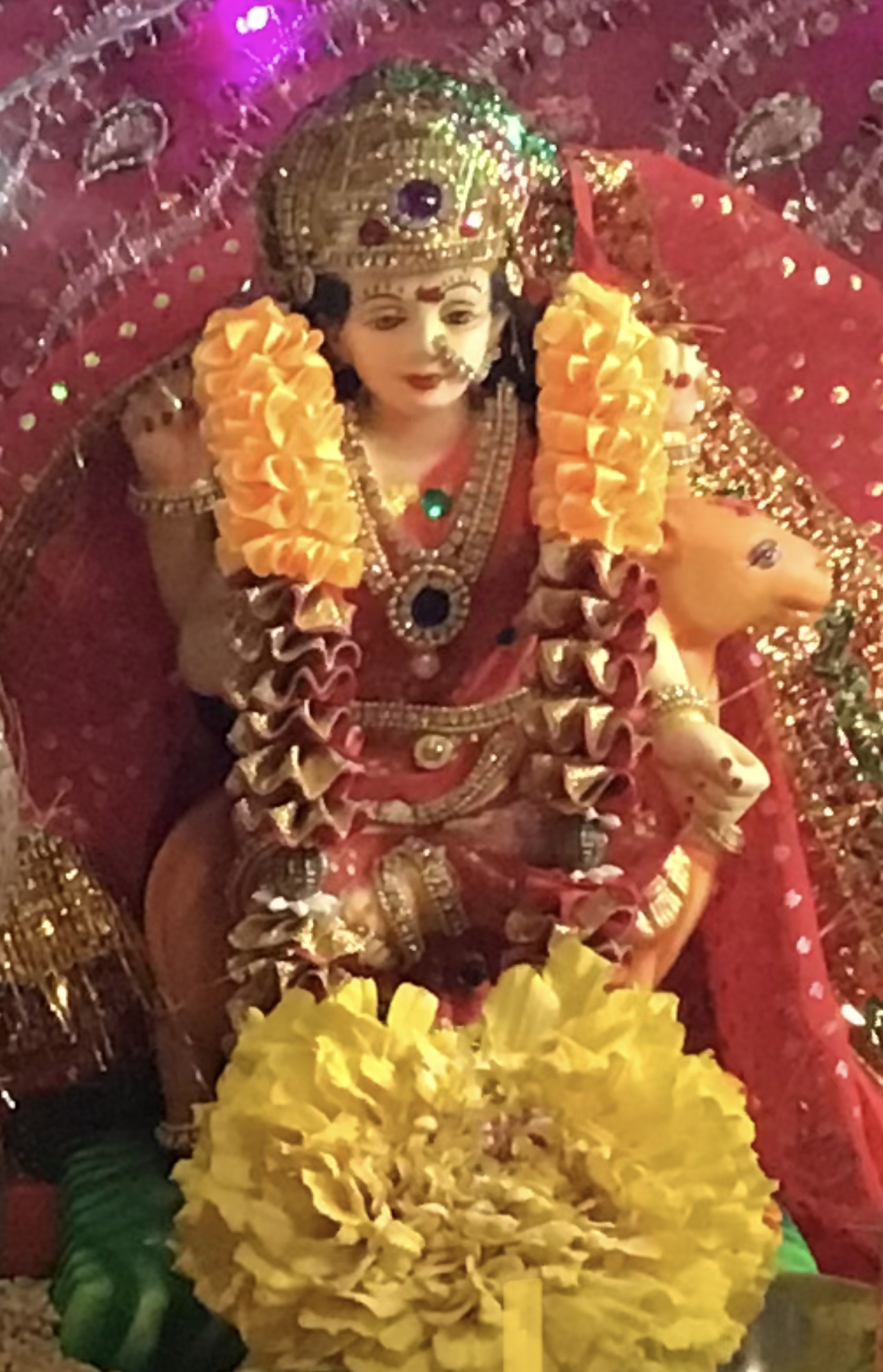
- Murti of Dashama
- Other names: Dashama
- Mantra: Om Aim Hrim Klim Momaimaa Namo Namah
- Weapon: Trishula, Sword
- Animals: Camel
- Temples: Moragadh, Minawada
- Festivals: Punj

Momai or Momai Mata (Gujarati: મોમાઈ માં) also known as Dashama is a regional Hindu goddess, popular in Gujarat, especially in desert region of Kutch.

== Description ==
Momai is the highest goddess of the Rabari Tribe. Sorathia group of Rabari called her as a mammai. The village Momai Mora located near Rapar in Kutch is the place where the deity is said to have first appeared, the temple is a place of pilgrimage and huge festival is celebrated here on eve of Navratri every year. She is worshiped as one of the kuldevi of Mav (Bhanushali), hiyad (Rabari), Jadeja, Chavda (Ahir),Parmar, Sodha, Jadav,Miyatra(Ahir), Baraliya (Ahir), Tank, Odedra (Mer) and other rulers & warrior clans of erstwhile kutch State and is closely associated with the Goddess Ashapura. She is depicted as mounted on a camel, with four hands. She holds a sword and a trident in the upper right and left hand, respectively and in the lower right and left hands, she has a lotus and armor. Apart from jadeja, parmar, Sodha clan, she is worshiped as Kuldevi by Udesh gotra of Rajpurohit community. The Rabari clan of Kutch also worship her. Her image is found in almost every household of Rabaris. Bardai Brahmins also worship her as kuladevi. Many sub-clans of Mistris of Kutch also worship her as their kuladevi.

== Dashama Vrata ==
Dashama Vrata is an annual 10-day Hindu festival or vrata (religious vow), mainly observed in the Indian state of Gujarat and Diu. This vrata is usually observed in July–August on the amavasya (new moon day) of the Hindu month of Ashadha. Many people also observe the vrata in the month of Chaitra (March). The vrata is mainly observed by women for prosperity and good fortune of their family.
