= Rishi Panchami =

Hindu festival honouring the seven sages

- Observed by: Hindus
- Type: Religious, India and Nepal
- Significance: Hindu observance celebrated on the fifth day (Panchami) of the Shukla Paksha in the month of Bhadrapada. It is traditionally associated with purifying menstrual sins.
- Observances: Veneration of the seven sages and Arundhati, fasting, prayer
- Date: Fifth day (Panchami) of the month of Bhadrapada month of the Lunar calendar

Rishi Panchami (Sanskrit: ऋषिपंचमी, romanized: Rṣipañcamī) is a Hindu observance held on the fifth day of the month of Bhadrapada of the Lunar calendar, the next day after Ganesh Chaturthi. In the customs of Hinduism, women are considered impure during four days of their menstrual cycle. Thus, observing Rishi Panchami puja provides a ritual opportunity to ask for forgiveness and purify body and soul from the possible violation or sins during menstruation. In some parts of Kerala, the day is also observed as Vishvakarma Puja.

== Practices ==
On this occasion, the seven sages and the wife of Vasishtha, Arundhati, are venerated with a betel leaf, flowers, camphor, and a lamp. Women are prescribed undertake a fast in the observance of this vrata, but men are also allowed to fast for the welfare of their wives. Brahmins are offered dakshina by adherents on this occasion, believed to be favourable in the veneration of the seven sages. In the Bhojpuri region, the festival is widely observed with traditional rituals, fasting, and the singing of folk songs. Maheshwari and Kayastha Community celebrate this day as Raksha Bandhan

== See also ==
- Savitri Vrata
- Varalakshmi Vrata
- Vasant Panchami
