= Ashadha =

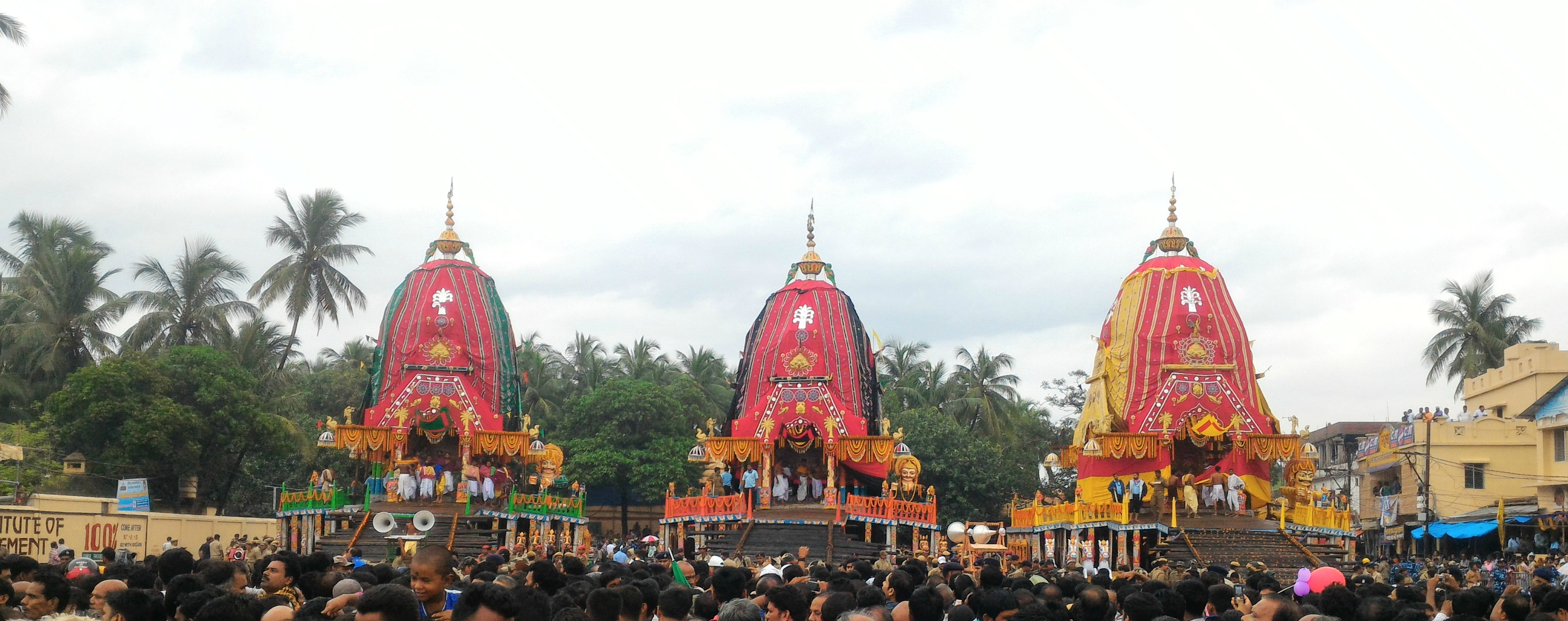
- Ratha Yatra in Puri
- Native name: आषाढ (Sanskrit)
- Calendar: Hindu calendar
- Month number: 4
- Number of days: 29 or 30
- Season: Grishma (summer)
- Gregorian equivalent: June–July
- Significant days: Aadi Amavasai; Guru Purnima; Ratha Yatra; Shayani Ekadashi

Ashadha is the fourth month of the Hindu lunar calendar and the Indian national calendar. The name of the month is derived from the position of the Moon near the Purva Ashadha nakshatra (star) on the full moon day. The month corresponds to the end of the summer (Grishma) season and falls in June–July of the Gregorian calendar.

In the Hindu solar calendar, it corresponds to the month of Mithuna and begins with the Sun's entry into Gemini. It corresponds to Asharh, the third month in the Bengali calendar. In the Tamil calendar, it corresponds to the fourth month of Aadi, falling in the Gregorian months of July–August. In the Vaishnava calendar, it corresponds to the fourth month of Vamana.

In the Hindu lunar calendar, each month has 29 or 30 days. The month begins on the next day after the Amavasya (new moon) or Purnima (full moon) as per amanta and purnimanta systems respectively. A month consists of two cycles of 15 days each, Shukla Paksha (waning moon) and Krishna Paksha (waxing moon). Days in each cycle is labeled as a tithi, with each tithi repeating twice in a month.

== Festivals ==
Guru Purnima, a festival dedicated to honoring the gurus (teachers), is celebrated on the Purnima (full moon) day of the month. Rath Yatra is an annual public temple car procession dedicated to Jagannath held in Puri during the month. Shayani Ekadashi, dedicated to Hindu god Vishnu, is observed on the Ekadashi (eleventh lunar day) thithi of Shukla Paksha (waning moon.

The month is dedicated to Mariamman amongst the Tamils, and Aadi Amavasai, celebrated on Amavasya (new moon) of the month is an important festival. In Gujarat, Dashama Vrata, dedicated to Momai, is observed on the Amavasya of the month. The Kakkada month in Kodava calendar, which corresponds to Ashadha, is considered one of the significant and auspicious months by the Tuluvas. Various delicacies such as aati soppu, and kakkada paayasa are prepared to commemorate the same.

The end of summer and impending arrival of the monsoon marks the time for cultivating paddy in various regions of the Indian subcontinent. In Nepal, the occasion is marked by the Ropain festivel, welcoming the monsoon season. The festival includes planting the first seedlings, followed by celebrating by throwing mud at each other and people sharing dahi chiura (beaten rice with curds) with each other.

== See also ==
- Astronomical basis of the Hindu calendar
- Hindu astronomy
- Hindu units of measurement
- Jyotish
