= Bhadrapada =

Sixth month of the Hindu lunar calendar

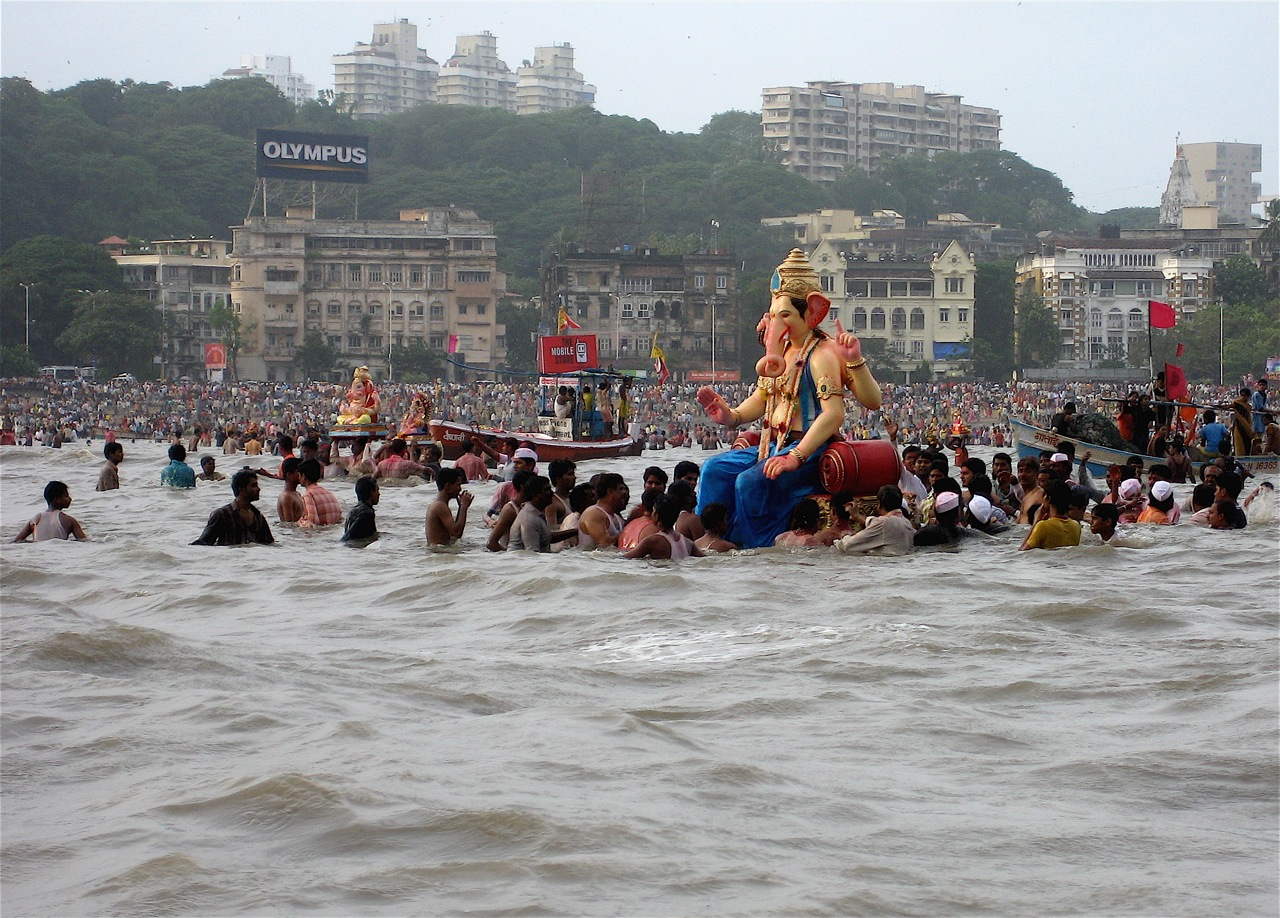
- Immersion of Ganesha idols during Ganesh Chaturthi
- Native name: भाद्रपद (Sanskrit)
- Calendar: Hindu calendar
- Month number: 6
- Number of days: 29 or 30
- Season: Varsha (monsoon)
- Gregorian equivalent: August–September
- Significant days: Anant Chaturdashi; Ganesh Chaturthi; Janmashtami (Note: As per Purnimanta tradition. The Hindu calendar follows two various systems:Amanta and Purnimanta. As per the amānta tradition, the lunar month ends on the new moon day and as per the purnimānta tradition, it ends on the full moon day. As a consequence, in the amanta tradition, Shukla Paksha (waxing moon) precedes Krishna Paksha (waning moon) in every lunar month, whereas the reverse happens in purnimānta tradition. Hence, Shukla Paksha will always belong to the same month in both traditions, whereas Krishna Paksha will always be associated with different but succeeding months in each tradition. Amanta tradition is officially followed by the Indian national calendar.); Karam; Kush Amavasya; Madhu Purnima; Onam; Pitru Paksha; Radhastami; Rishi Panchami

Bhadrapada is the sixth month of the Hindu lunar calendar and the Indian national calendar. The name of the month is derived from the position of the Moon near the Purva Bhadrapada nakshatra (star) on the full moon day. The month corresponds to the monsoon (Varsha) season and falls in August–September of the Gregorian calendar.

In the Hindu solar calendar, it corresponds to the month of Simha and begins with the Sun's entry into Leo. It corresponds to Bhadro, the fifth month in the Bengali calendar. In the Tamil calendar, it corresponds to the sixth month of Purattasi, falling in the Gregorian months of September–October. In the Vaishnav calendar, it corresponds to the sixth month of Hrishikesha.

In the Hindu lunar calendar, each month has 29 or 30 days. The month begins on the next day after Amavasya (new moon) or Purnima (full moon) as per amanta and purnimanta systems respectively. A month consists of two cycles of 15 days each, Shukla Paksha (waxing moon) and Krishna Paksha (waning moon). Days in each cycle is labeled as a thithi, with each thithi repeating twice in a month.

== Festivals ==
In Hinduism, the month of Bhadrapada is dedicated to god Vishnu, with the devotees practicing various rituals to seek his blessings. People usually observe fasting on Saturdays, Ekadashi (eleventh day) thithi, and Purnima (full moon) of the month and do pujas.

=== Ganesh Chaturthi ===
Ganesh Chaturthi is a Hindu festival that celebrates the birthday of god Ganesha. It is observed on the Chaturthi (fourth day) thithi of Shukla Paksha (waxing moon). The festival is marked by the installation of Ganesha idols in homes and public pandals, daily prayers, offerings (including modak), and devotional singing. The festival culminates on Anant Chaturdashi, celebrated on the Chaturdashi thithi, ten days after Chaturthi. On this day, the idols are immersed in a body of water (visarjan) symbolising his return to his heavenly abode.

=== Janmashtami and Radhastami ===
As per the Purnimanta tradition of the Hindu lunar calendar, god Krishna was born on the Ashtami (eighth day) thithi of Krishna Paksha (waning moon) of Bhadrapada. Krishna's consort Radha was born on the eighth day of Shukla Paksha of the same month, and Radhastami is celebrated to commemorate the same.

=== Onam ===
Onam is a multi-day harvest festival celebrated in Kerala. It is associated with the legend of king Mahabali, who once ruled Kerala, returning each year to visit his people. The festival consists of various traditions such as floral rangolis (Pookolam), boat races and a grand feast (sadya).

=== Pitru Paksha ===
The dark fortnight (Krishna Paksha) of the month is reserved for the veneration of the dead. During the period known as Pitru Paksha, Hindus pay homage to their ancestors through special offerings.

=== Others ===
Karam is a harvest festival celebrated by certain tribes in the Eastern Indian states of Jharkhand, Odisha, and West Bengal. During the festivities, people plant new seedlings, and worship the Karam tree for a good harvest, followed by community singing and feast. Kush Amavasya is observed on the new moon day of the month, during which people collect sacred grass (kusha) which is used in various Hindu rituals. Madhu Purnima is a Buddhist festival observed on the full moon day (Purnima) of the month, during which people perform charity and give offerings to monasteries. Rishi Panchami is celebrated on the Panchami (fifth day) of the bright half (Shukla Paksha) of the month, and the festival honours the Saptarishi (seven sages) and involves ritual bathing, fasting, and prayers by women for the welfare and longevity of their families.

== See also ==
- Astronomical basis of the Hindu calendar
- Hindu astrology
- Hindu calendar
- Indian astronomy
- Indian units of measurement
