= Purnima =

Sanskrit word for full moon day

Purnima Pūrṇimā
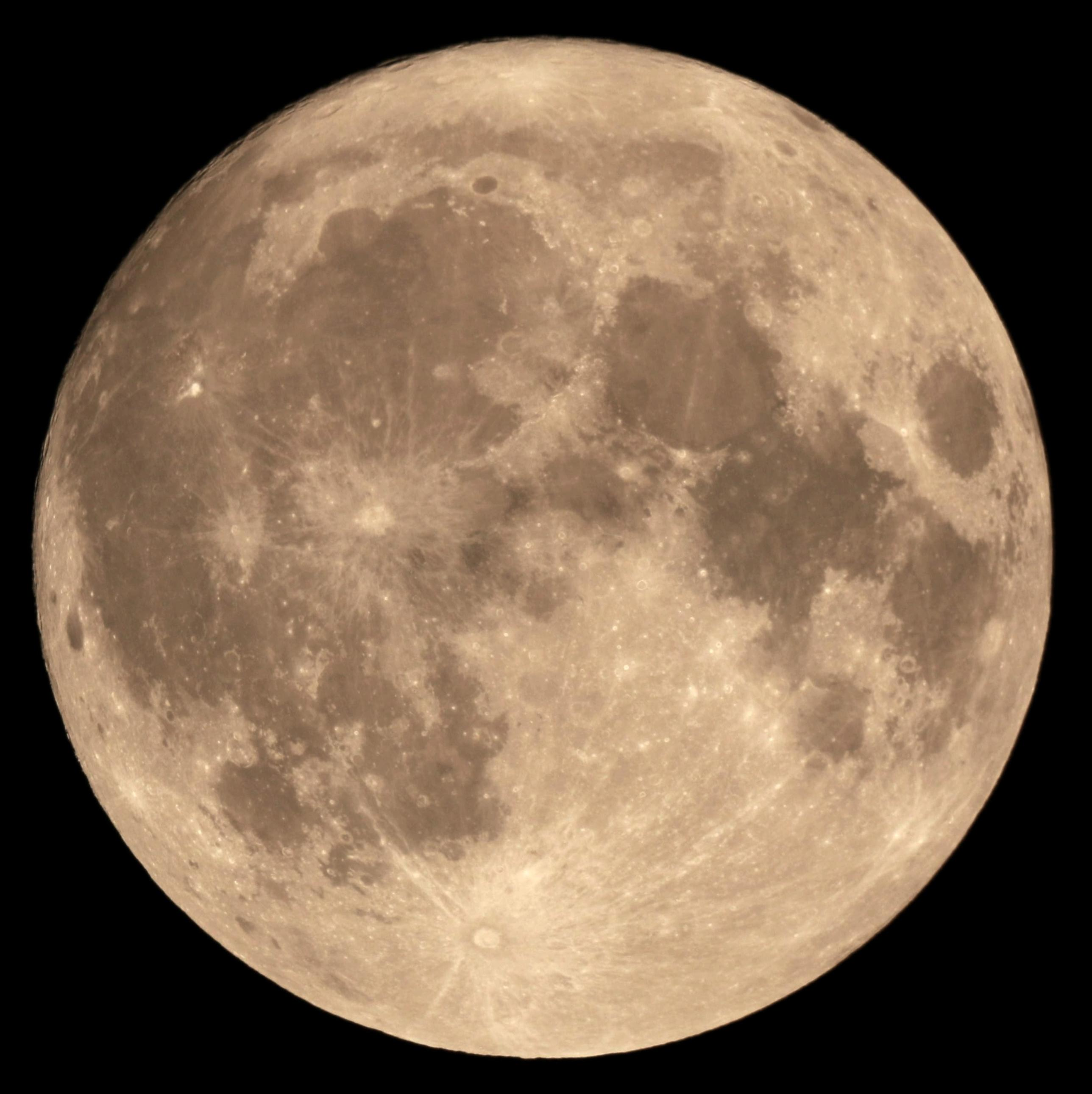
- Full moon as visible from the Earth
- Genre: Natural phenomena
- Frequency: Monthly

Purnima (Sanskrit: Pūrṇimā) represents the lunar phase of full moon in the Hindu calendar. A calendar month ends on purnima as per the purnimanta tradition of the Hindu lunar calendar. (Note: The Hindu calendar follows two various systems:Amanta and Purnimanta. As per the amanta tradition, the lunar month ends on the new moon day and as per the purnimanta tradition, it ends on the full moon day. As a consequence, in the amanta tradition, Shukla paksha (waning moon) precedes Krishna paksha (waxing moon) in every lunar month, whereas the reverse happens in purnimānta tradition. Hence, Shukla paksha will always belong to the same month in both traditions, whereas Krishna paksha will always be associated with different but succeeding months in each tradition. The Amanta tradition is officially followed by the Indian national calendar.) Various Hindu beliefs and festivals are associated with the purnima day of various months.

== Etymology ==
Purnima is derived from Sanskrit words purni meaning "full" or "complete" and ma meaning "moon" signifying the full moon.

== Description ==
Phases of the Moon

In the Hindu lunar calendar, each month has 29 or 30 days. The month begins on the next day after Amavasya (new moon) or Purnima (full moon) in the amanta and purnimanta systems respectively. The amanta system is followed majorly in the South India and the purnimanta system in North India. A month consists of two cycles– Shukla Paksha (waning moon) and Krishna Paksha (waxing moon), consisting of 15 days each. Days in each cycle is labeled as a thithi, with each thithi representing the different phases of the moon and repeating twice in a month.

Purnima corresponds to the period when the Moon is aligned with the Sun and the Earth in syzygy. The Earth comes in between the Sun and the Moon, which are aligned at 180 degrees of ecliptic longitude. The full moon shows 100% illumination of the lunar disk as seen from Earth, as the Sun and Moon are on opposite sides of the planet. It causes high tides known as spring tides due to the combined gravitational pull of the Sun and Moon acting along the same line. A full moon can also coincide with a lunar eclipse, which occurs when the Earth passes directly between the Sun and Moon, casting its shadow on the moon's surface.

== Festivals ==
=== Kartika month ===
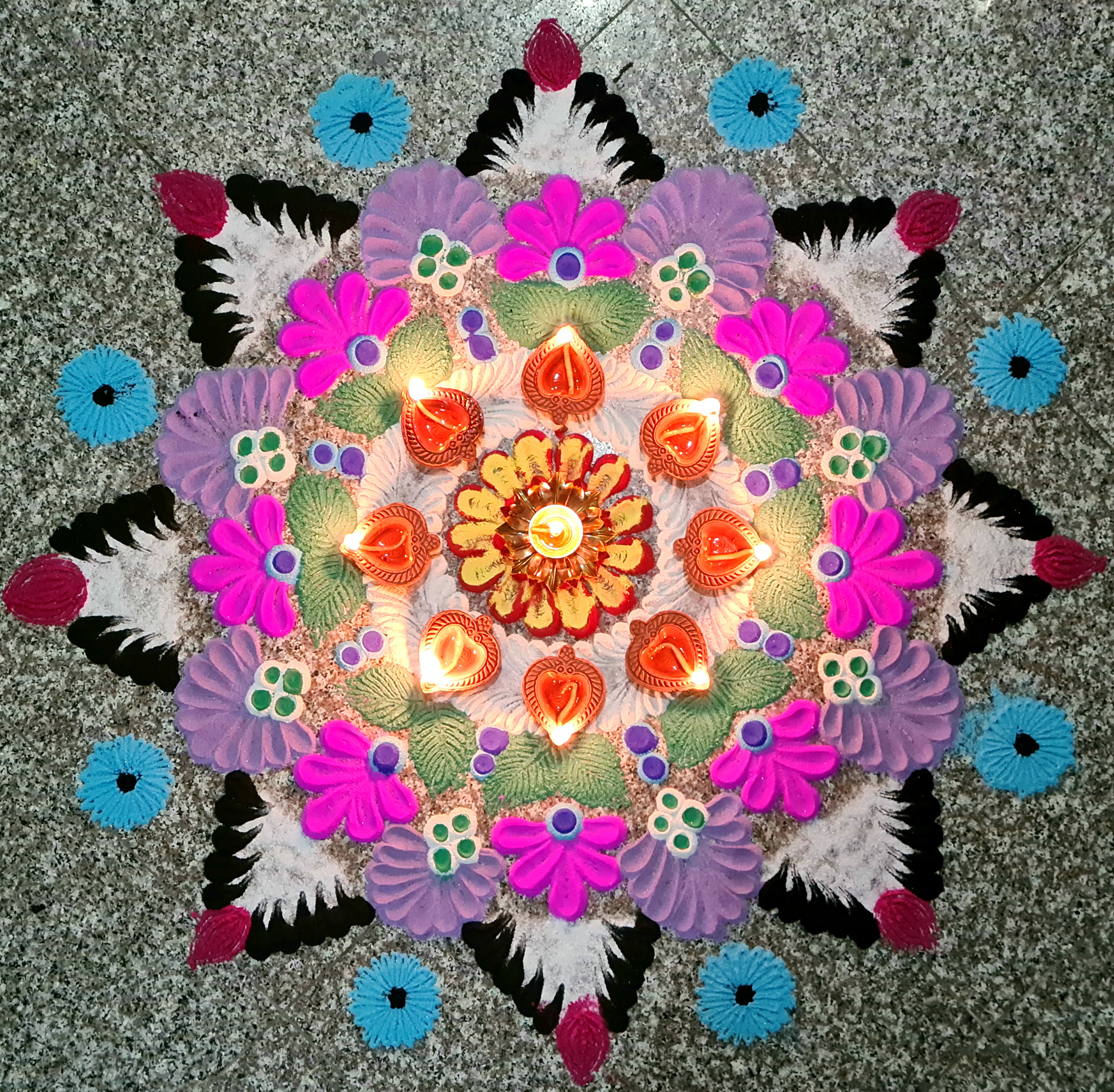
Oil lamps arranged on a kolam during Karthika Deepam

Kartik Purnima is celebrated as Dev Deepavali by Hindus in parts of India, and involves fairs, pilgrimages, lamp-lighting and ritual bathing in sacred rivers. The Ayyappan garland festival is celebrated in Sabarimala on the day known as Tripuri Purnima.

Karthika Deepam is a festival of lights observed mainly by Tamils and Telugu people in the Karthigai month of the Tamil calendar. The festival is celebrated on the full moon day of the month coinciding with the Kṛttikā nakshatra. The festival is dedicated to god Kartikeya and is commemorated by lighting deepams outside and inside the homes.

On the Purnima day of the Kartika month, Jains commemorate the achievement of nirvana by the Tirthankara Mahavira, and the Sikhs celebrate Guru Nanak Jayanti, the birthday of Sikh guru Guru Nanak.

=== Shravana month ===
Various Hindu religious festivals are celebrated on the Purnima day of the month in the Shravana month. Raksha Bandhan celebrates the bond between brothers and sisters, wherein sister(s) tie a thread on the brother's wrist. In Haryana and Punjab, people observe the festival of Salono. During the day, priests tie amulets on people's wrists for protection against evil. The festival of also involves a sister tying a thread called ponchi on a brother's hand.

On the Purnima day, certain communities such as Brahmins perform rituals associated with Upakarma. Men change their sacred thread and begin to don a new one on the day annually.

Narali Poornima is celebrated in parts of Western India, where in coconuts are offered to Hindu god Varuna. It marks the beginning of the fishing season, and the fishermen make an offering to the god for bountiful harvest. The Purnima day is also celebrated as Balarama's birthday.

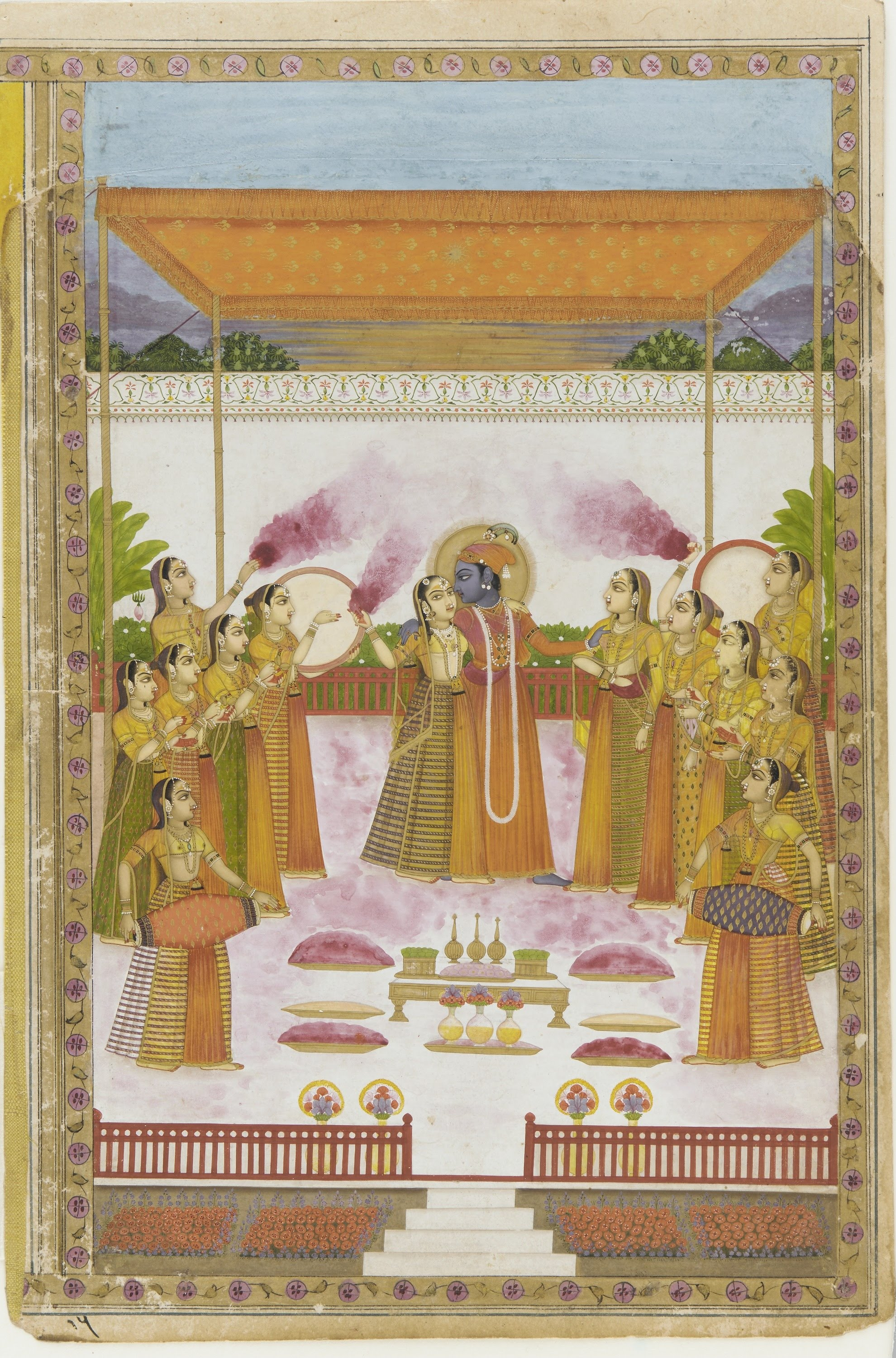
Krishna and Radha celebrating Holi festival

In Odisha, Gamha Purnima is celebrated during which domesticated cows and bullocks are decorated and worshipped. Country-made sweet such as pitha and mitha are made and distributed within families, relatives and friends. In Jagannath culture, Krishna and Radha are believed to have enjoyed the rainy season of the month while playing on a swing. The celebration commemorating the event usually starts on Ekadashi (four days before Purnima) and ends with Jhulan yatra on Gamha Purnima. The idols of Radha-Krishna are decorated and placed on a swing (jhulan) on the day.

In parts of Central India such as Madhya Pradesh, Chhattisgarh and Jharkhand, the Purnima day is celebrated as Kajari Purnima. The festivities start on Navami (ninth day) after Amavasya, and ends on the full moon day. Women, who have sons, perform various rituals on the day. In parts of Gujarat, the Purnima day marks the event of Pavitropana. On this day, people perform puja to worship Shiva. Cotton threads or strands of grass are soaked in panchagavya, and tied around a lingam.

=== Phalguna month ===
Holi is a Hindu festival celebrated to mark the end of winter and the arrival of spring (Vasanta) in the month of Phalguna. It celebrates various events from Hindu mythology including the love between god Krishna and his consort Radha. It symbolises the victory of good over evil and includes the ritual of lighting bonfires (Holika Dahan) the night before. The bonfire is lit to symbolise the burning away of evil, and is attributed to the event in which Prahalada is saved by god Vishnu from a fire lit by demoness Holika, who is made to instead burn in it. The festival involves throwing coloured powders (gulal) and coloured water, with each colour carrying symbolic meanings.

Panguni Uthiram is a Tamil festival that falls on the day when the Nakshatra (star) of Uttiram aligns with Purnima day in the Tamil month of Panguni. The day commemorates the divine marriages of Hindu deities such as Shiva and Parvati, Murugan and Deivanai, and Vishnu and Lakshmi. It also marks the day of manifestation of lord Ayyappan. On the day, special rituals, processions and marriage ceremonies of gods are conducted across Hindu temples.

=== Other months ===
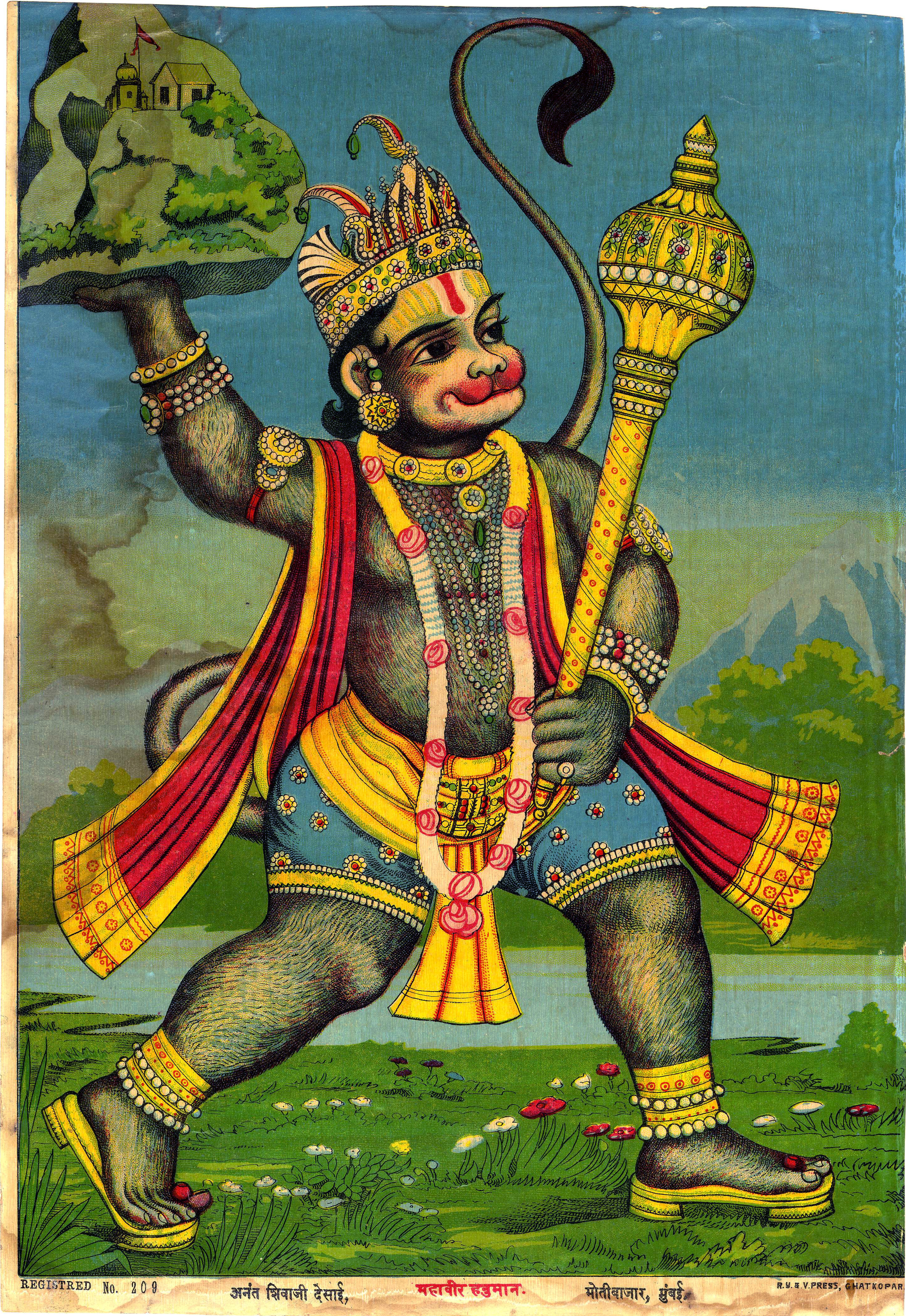
Hanuman Jayanti, dedicated to Hanuman (pictured), is observed on the Purnima day of the month of Chaitra

Vat Purnima is celebrated on the full moon day of the month of Jyeshtha. It honors Satyavan's wife Savitri, who rescued her husband from death by persuading Yama using her intelligence and devotion. Women pray for their husbands by tying threads around a banyan tree on this day.

Guru Purnima, a festival dedicated to honoring the gurus (teachers), is celebrated on the Purnima day of the month of Ashadha. It is also known as Vyasa Purnima after Vyasa, the author of the Mahabharata.

Sharad Poornima is observed on the Purnima day of the month of Ashvin. It marks the end of monsoon season. During the festival, various Hindu gods are worshipped along with Chandra, the moon deity, and are offered flowers and sweets.

Buddha Purnima or Vesākha is celebrated on the Purnima day of the month of Vaishakha and commemorates the birth anniversary of Siddhartha Gautama.

Hanuman Jayanti, dedicated to Hanuman, is observed on the Purnima day of the month of Chaitra. Chitra Pournami is observed on the full moon day (Pournami) of the Tamil month of Chithirai (April–May) and is dedicated to Chitragupta, the divine accountant for Yama. People take a holy bath in rivers or temple tanks on this day to cleanse the sins of the past. Other rituals include special pujas to Indra, offerings of rice, and Kavadi Attam dedicated to Murugan.

Madhu Purnima is a Buddhist festival observed on the full moon day (Purnima) of the month of Bhadrapada, during which people perform charity and give offerings to monasteries. Shraddha Purnima is celebrated in the same month of Bhadrapada in the Hindu lunar calendar. On this day, the Uma Maheshvara Vrata is performed for the propitiation of the divine couple Shiva and Parvati, seeking marital harmony and spiritual merit. The day is also associated with the observance of the Shakra Vrata, in which lord Indra is worshipped for prosperity and the well-being of children.

Datta Jayanti, commemorating the birth of the deity Dattatreya, is celebrated on the full moon day of the month of Margashira. Dattatreya is revered as the combined avatar of Brahma, Vishnu and Shiva. Worship of Dattatreya on this day is believed to bestow wisdom, remove obstacles, and mitigate ancestral curses (Pitru Dosha).

Shakambhari Purnima is celebrated on the full moon day of the month of Pausha, and marks the culmination of the nine-day Shakambhari Navaratri. The festival marks the descent of the goddess Shakambhari, a form of goddess Durga.

== See also ==
- Hindu astronomy
- Hindu units of measurement
- Jyotish
