= Pitru Paksha =

16–lunar day period in Hindu calendar for ancestral worship

Pitri Paksha
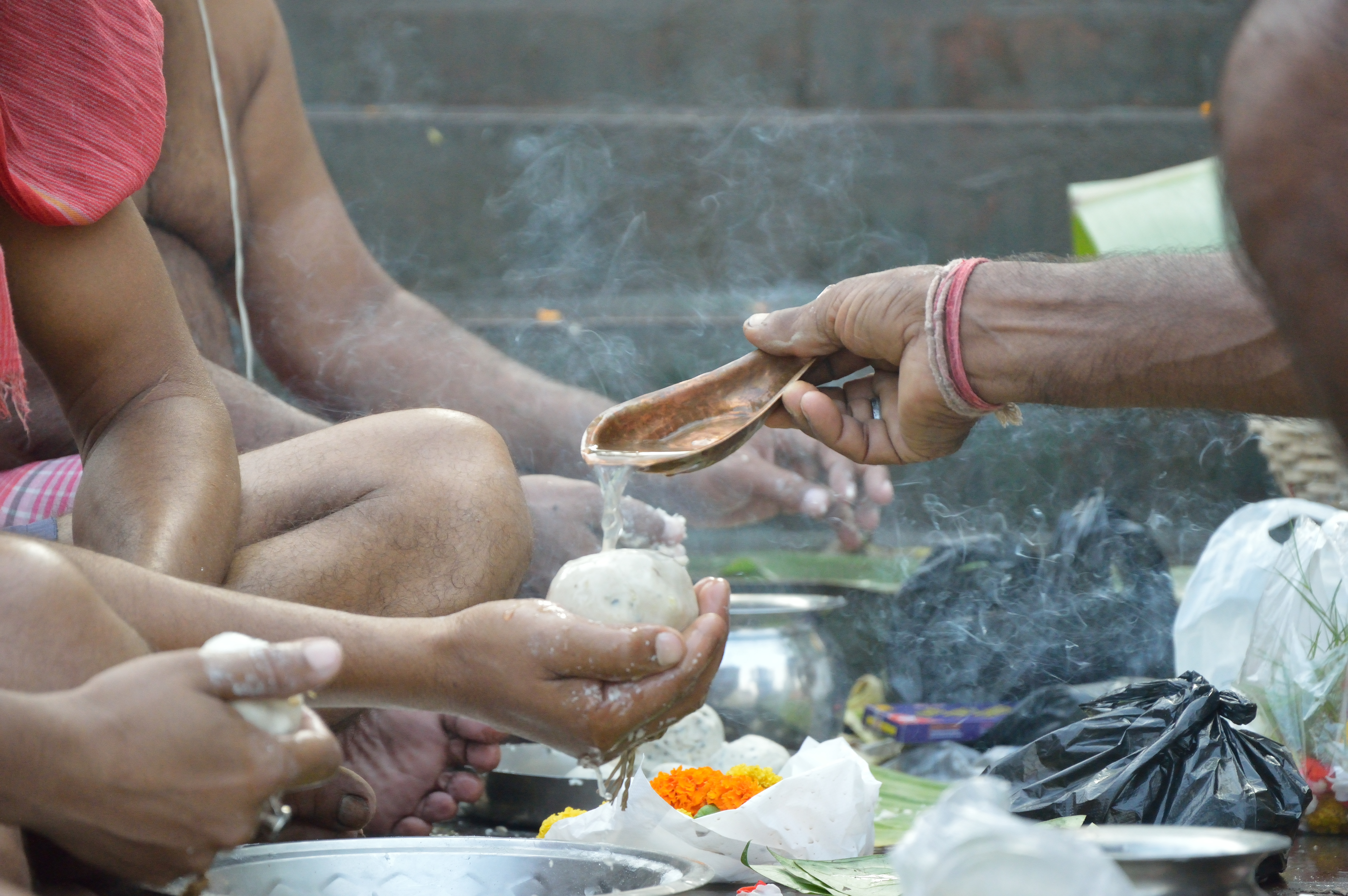
- Pitri Paksha rites being performed on the banks of the Hooghly River at Jagannath Ghat in Kolkata, 2012
- Observed by: Hindus
- Type: Hindu
- Celebrations: 16 lunar days
- Observances: Shraddha: paying homage to their ancestors, especially by food offerings
- Date: Bhadra Purnima, Ashvin Krishna Pratipada, Ashvin Krishna Dwitiya, Ashvin Krishna Tritiya, Ashvin Krishna Chaturthi, Ashvin Krishna Panchami, Ashvin Krishna Shashthi, Ashvin Krishna Saptami, Ashvin Krishna Ashtami, Ashvin Krishna Navami, Ashvin Krishna Dashami, Ashvin Krishna Ekadashi, Ashvin Krishna Dwadashi, Ashvin Krishna Trayodashi, Ashvin Krishna Chaturdashi, Ashvin Amavasya
- Duration: 16 Days
- Frequency: Annual
- Related to: Aadi Amavasya, Galungan, Veneration of the dead

Explanatory note on Hindu festival dates
- The Hindu calendar is lunisolar but most festival dates are specified using the lunar portion of the calendar. A lunar day is uniquely identified by three calendar elements: māsa (lunar month), pakṣa (lunar fortnight) and tithi (lunar day). Furthermore, when specifying the masa, one of two traditions are applicable, viz. amānta / pūrṇimānta. If a festival falls in the waning phase of the moon, these two traditions identify the same lunar day as falling in two different (but successive) masa. A lunar year is shorter than a solar year by about eleven days. As a result, most Hindu festivals occur on different days in successive years on the Gregorian calendar.

Pitri Paksha (Sanskrit: पितृ पक्ष, lit. '"fortnight of the paternal ancestors"', IAST: Pitṛ pakṣa) is a 16-lunar day period in the Hindu calendar when Hindus pay homage to their ancestors (Pitri), especially through food offerings. The period is also known as Pitarpas, Pitru Paksha/Pitr-Paksha, Pitri Pokkho, Sorah Shraddha ("sixteen shraddhas"), Kanagat, Jitiya, Mahalaya, Apara Paksha and akhadpak.

Pitri Paksha is considered by Hindus to be inauspicious, given the death rite performed during the ceremony, known as Shraddha or Tarpana. In southern and western India, it falls in the second paksha (fortnight) Hindu lunar month of Bhadrapada (September) and follows the fortnight immediately after Ganesh Utsav. It begins on the Pratipada (first day of the fortnight) ending with the no moon day known as Sarvapitri Amavasya, Pitri Amavasya, Peddala Amavasya or Mahalaya Amavasya (simply Mahalaya) Most years, the autumnal equinox falls within this period, i.e. the Sun transitions from the northern to the southern hemisphere during this period. In North India and Nepal, and cultures following the purnimanta calendar or the solar calendar, this period may correspond to the waning fortnight of the luni-solar month Ashvina, instead of Bhadrapada.

== Astronomical basis ==
As per Hindu traditions, the south celestial sphere is consecrated to the ancestors (Pitri). Hence, the moment when the Sun transits from the north to the south celestial sphere is considered to begin a day of the ancestors. This moment is considered sacred, necessitating the performance of special religious rites. Most years, this transit occurs during Bhadrapada masa Krishna paksha (as per the amanta tradition) / Ashvina masa Krishna paksha (as per the purnimanta tradition). Hence this paksha has been designated as Pitri paksha and Hindus perform special religious rites during this entire period.

== Legend ==
In Hinduism, the souls of three preceding generations of one's ancestors reside in Pitriloka, a realm between heaven and earth. This realm is governed by Yama, the god of death, who takes the soul of a dying man from earth to Pitriloka. Only those three generations are given Shraddha rites, in which Yama plays a significant role. In Pitri Paksha, prayers are offered to bring upon moksha, both for the ancestors and for those performing the rituals. According to Swami Sivananda, Pitri Paksha increases the enjoyment of souls remaining in heaven before undergoing samsara or rebirth, or mitigates the suffering of those in other worlds; in the case those souls took another birth immediately after their deaths, Shraddha adds to their happiness in their new birth.

According to the sacred Hindu epics, at the beginning of Pitri Paksha, the sun enters the zodiac sign of Virgo (Kanya). Coinciding with this moment, it is believed that the spirits leave Pitriloka and reside in their descendants' homes for a month until the sun enters the next zodiac— Libra(Tulā)—and there is a full moon. Hindus are expected to propitiate the ancestors in the first half, during the dark fortnight.

When the legendary donor Karna died in the epic Mahabharata war and his soul transcended to heaven, he became plagued with extreme hunger, but any food he touched became gold instantly. Karna and Surya went to Indra and asked him about the cause of this situation. Indra told Karna that he had donated gold his entire life, but had never donated food to his ancestors in shraddha. Hence, the Kuru ancestors who were stuck in limbo cursed him. Karna said that since he was unaware of his ancestry, he never donated anything in their memory. To make amends, Karna was permitted to return to the earth for a 15-day period, so that he could perform shraddha to them and donate food and water in their memory. This period is now known as Pitri Paksha. In some legends, Yama replaces Indra.

== Significance ==
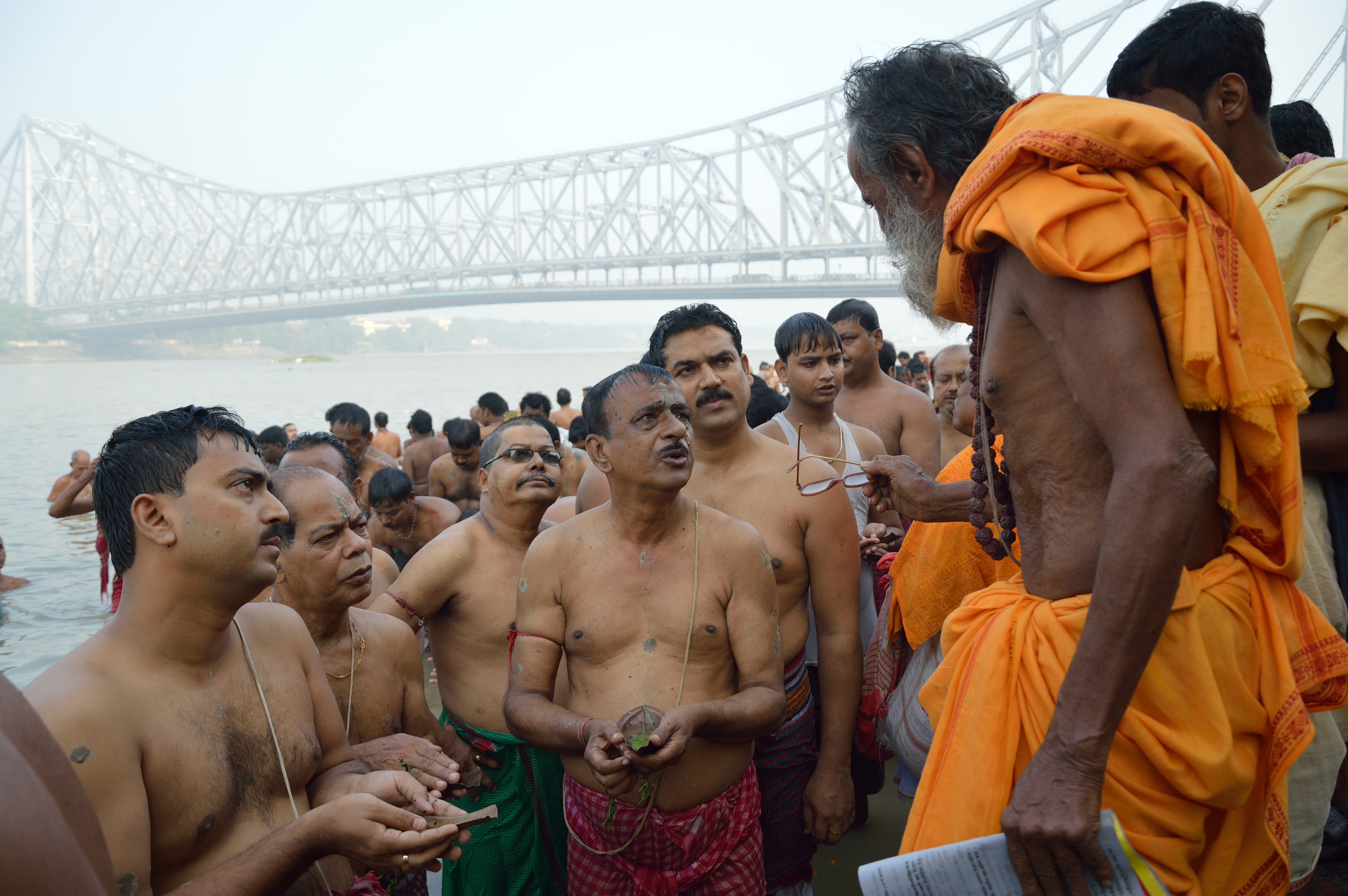
The Tarpana (offering holy water to the manes) at Jagannath Ghat, Kolkata

The performance of Shraddha by a son during Pitri Paksha is considered compulsory by Hindus, to ensure that the soul of the ancestor goes to heaven. In this context, the scripture Garuda Purana says, "there is no salvation for a man without a son". The scriptures preach that a householder should propitiate ancestors (Pitris), along with the gods (devas), elements (bhutas) and guests. The scripture Markandeya Purana says that if the ancestors are content with the shraddhas, they will bestow health, wealth, knowledge and longevity, and ultimately heaven and salvation (moksha) upon the performer.

The performance of Sarvapitri amavasya rites can also compensate a forgotten or neglected annual Shraddha ceremony, which should ideally coincide with the death anniversary of the deceased. According to Sharma, the ceremony is central to the concept of lineages. Shraddha involves oblations to three preceding generations—by reciting their names—as well as to the lineage ancestor (gotra). A person thus gets to know the names of six generations (three preceding generation, his own and two succeeding generations—his sons and grandsons) in his life, reaffirming lineage ties. Anthropologist Usha Menon of Drexel University presents a similar idea—that Pitri Paksha emphasises the fact that the ancestors and the current generation and their next unborn generation are connected by blood ties. The current generation repays their debt to the ancestors in the Pitri Paksha. This debt is considered of utmost importance along with a person's debt to his gurus and his parents.

=== Bengali significance ===
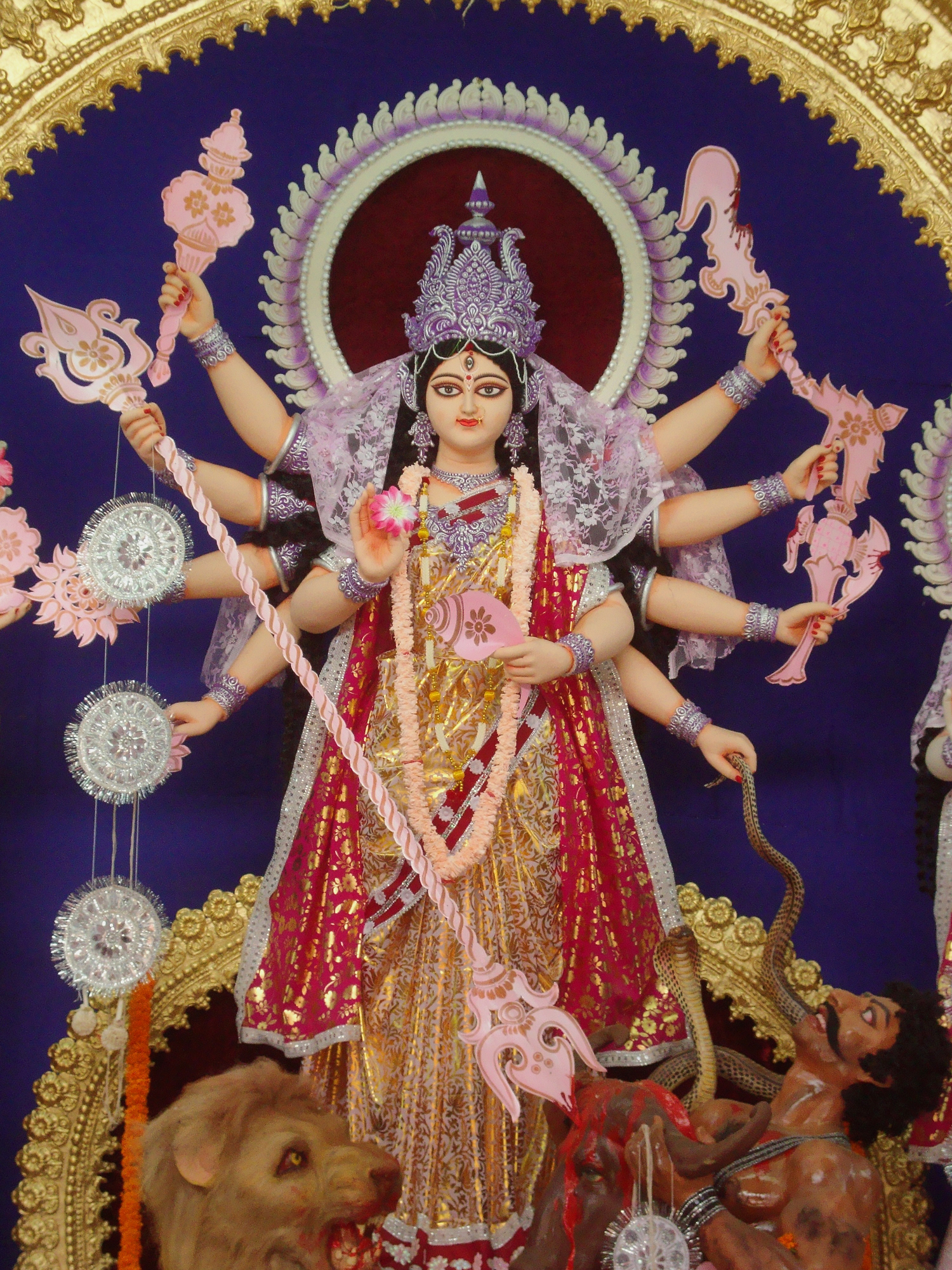
Mahalaya marks the formal beginning of the Durga Puja festival.

In Bengal, Mahalaya (Bengali: মহালয়া) (Mahalaya Amavasya) usually marks the beginning of Durga Puja festivities. Durga Puja, the biggest festival of the Bengalis, is celebrated annually during the Hindu calendar month Ashvin (September and October). The celebration begins with Mahalaya. Mahalaya is the day when the goddess Durga is believed to have descended to Earth. Bengali people traditionally wake up early in the morning on Mahalaya to recite hymns from the Devi Mahatmya (Chandi) scripture. Every Bengali household wakes up at dawn to listen to a collection of songs and mantras known as the Durga Saptashati, that recounts goddess Durga’s birth and eventual triumph over the demon king Mahishasura. Offerings to the ancestors are made in homes and at puja mandaps (temporary shrines).

== Rules of Shraddha ==
=== When and where ===
The shraddha is performed on the specific lunar day during the Pitri Paksha, when the ancestor—usually a parent or paternal grandparent—died. There are exceptions to the lunar day rule; special days are allotted for people who died in a particular manner or had a certain status in life. Chautha Bharani and Bharani Panchami, the fourth and fifth lunar day respectively, are allocated for people deceased in the past year. Avidhava navami ("Unwidowed ninth"), the ninth lunar day, is for married women who died before their husband.

Widowers invite Brahmin women as guests for their wife's shraddha. The twelfth lunar day is for children and ascetics who had renounced the worldly pleasures. The fourteenth day is known as Ghata chaturdashi or Ghayala chaturdashi, and is reserved for those people killed by arms, in war or suffering a violent death.

Sarvapitri amavasya (all ancestors' new moon day) is intended for all ancestors, irrespective of the lunar day they died. It is the most important day of the Pitri Paksha. Those who have forgotten to perform shraddha can do so on this day. A shraddha ritual performed on this day is considered as fruitful as one conducted in the holy city of Gaya, which is seen as a special place to perform the rite, and hosts a fair during the Pitri Paksha period.

Matamaha ("Mother's father") or Dauhitra ("Daughter's son") also marks the first day of the month of Ashvin and beginning of the bright fortnight. It is assigned for the grandson of the deceased maternal grandfather.

The ritual is also held on the death anniversary of the ancestor. The shraddha is performed only at noon, usually on the bank of a river or lake or at one's own house. Families may also make a pilgrimage to places like Varanasi and Gaya to perform Shraddha. An annual Pitri Paksha Mela at Gaya on the banks of River Falgu. Pilgrims from all corners of the country visit Gaya for offering Pinda to their Ancestors. According to Bihar Tourism Department estimates, some 5,00,000 to 75,00,000 pilgrims arrive in the Gaya city during the Pitri Paksha Mela every year.

=== Who and for whom ===
It is essential that Shraddha be performed by the son—usually the eldest—or male relative of the paternal branch of the family, limited to the preceding three generations. However, on Sarvapitri amavasya or matamaha, the daughter's son can offer Shraddha for the maternal side of his family if a male heir is absent in his mother's family. Some castes only perform the shraddha for one generation. Prior to performing the rite, the male should have experienced a sacred thread ceremony. Since the ceremony is considered inauspicious due to its association with death, the royal family of Kutch, the king or heirs of the throne are prohibited from conducting Shraddha.

=== Food ===
The food offerings made to the ancestors are usually cooked in silver or copper vessels and typically placed on a banana leaf or cups made of dried leaves. The food must include Kheer (a type of sweet rice and milk), lapsi (a sweet porridge made of wheat grains), rice, dal (lentils), spring bean (guar) and a yellow gourd (pumpkin).

=== Rites of Shraddha ===
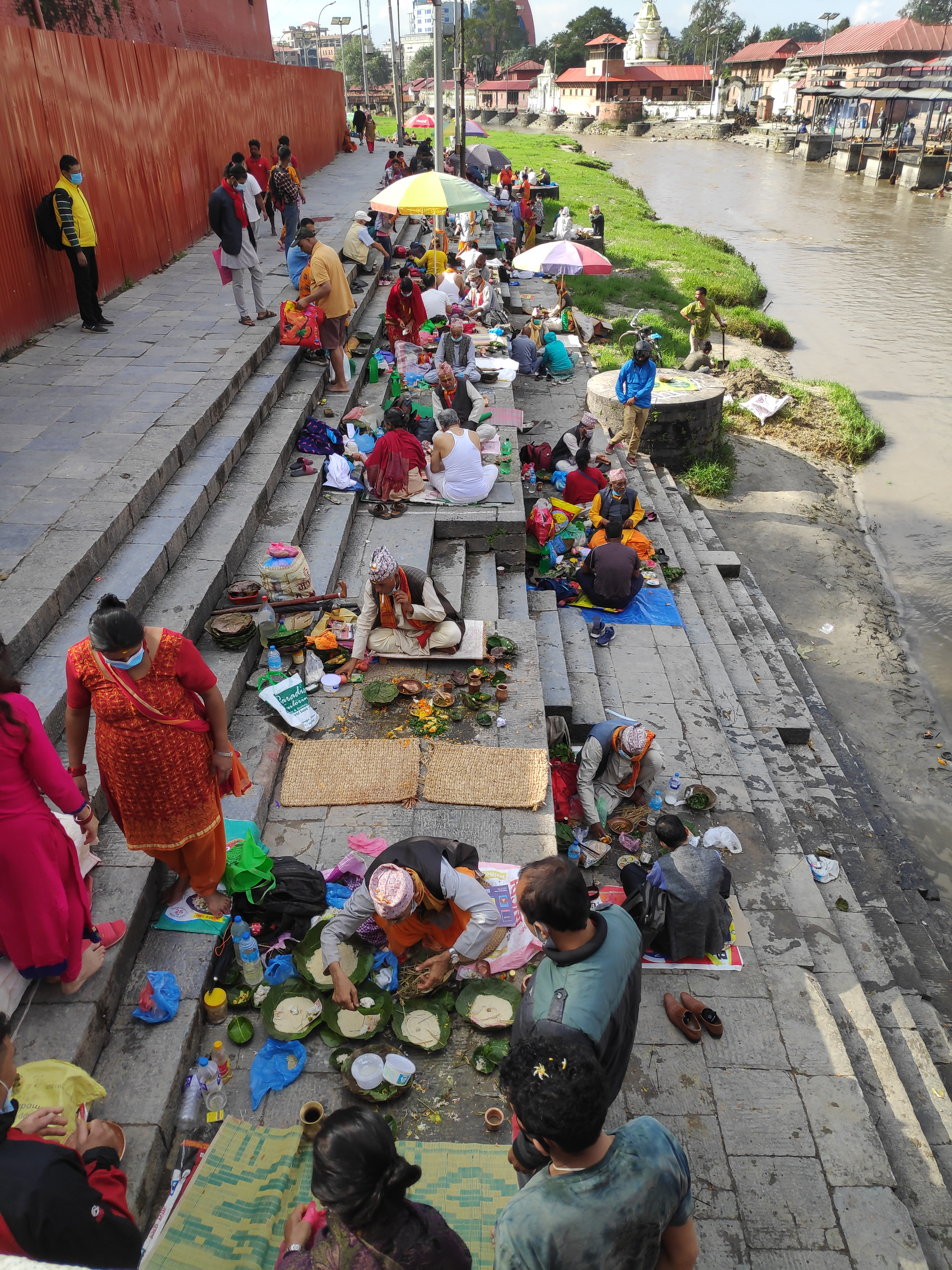
People performing shraddha on the banks of Bagmati river near Pashupatinath temple, Nepal

The male who performs the shraddha should take a purifying bath beforehand and is expected to wear a dhoti. He wears a ring of darbha grass. Then the ancestors are invoked to reside in the ring. The shraddha is usually performed bare-chested, as the position of the sacred thread worn by him needs to be changed multiple times during the ceremony. The shraddha involves pinda dana, which is an offering to the ancestors of pindas (cooked rice and barley flour balls mixed with ghee and black sesame seeds), accompanying the release of water from the hand. It is followed by the worship of Vishnu (in form of the darbha grass, a gold image, or Shaligram stone) and Yama. The food offering is then made, cooked especially for the ceremony on the roof. The offering is considered to be accepted if a crow arrives and devours the food; the bird is believed to be a messenger from Yama or the spirit of the ancestors. A cow and a dog are also fed, and Brahmin priests are also offered food. Once the ancestors (crow) and Brahmins have eaten, the family members can begin lunch.

== Other practices ==
Some families also conduct ritual recitals of scriptures such the Bhagavata Purana and the Bhagavad Gita. Others may be charitable and present gifts to the priests or pay them to recite prayers for the ancestors' well-being.

== See also ==
- Hindu genealogy registers at Haridwar
- Bhoot Chaturdashi
