= Bardai Brahmin =

Traditional Western Indian Community

Trikamji Bapu, representative of the Bardai Brahmin Samaj

Bardai Brahmins are a community living in Western India. They traditionally have a variety of professions, including priesthood, merchants, revenue collectors, teachers, and village policemen.
