= Lunar phase (Hinduism) =

Religious significance of lunar phases

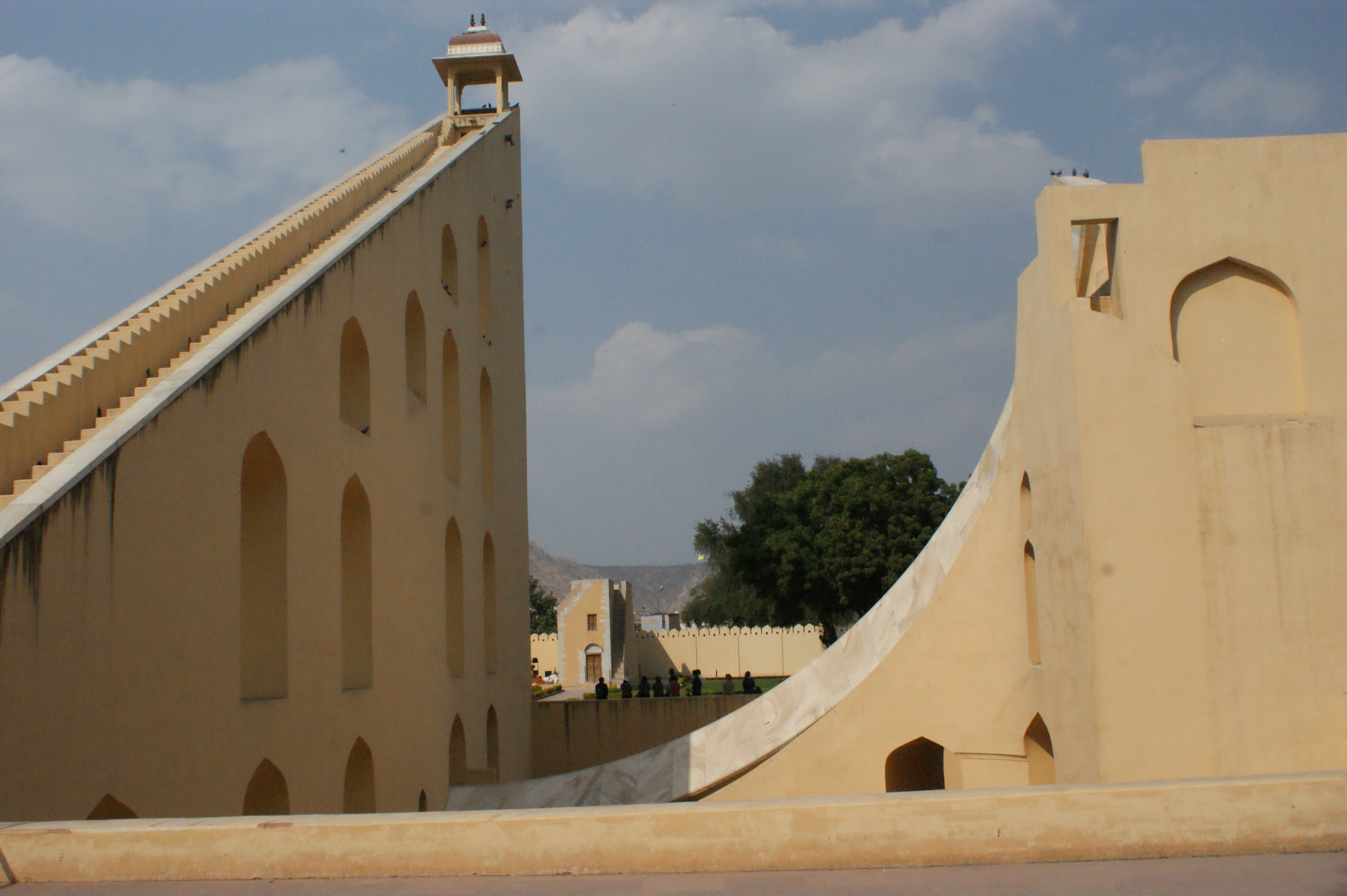
Jantar Mantar, Jaipur, an early 18th century astronomical observatory

In Hinduism, each lunar phase has religious and astrological significance. There are four principal (primary, or major) lunar phases: the new moon, first quarter, full moon, and last quarter (also known as third or final quarter), when the Moon's ecliptic longitude is at an angle to the Sun (as viewed from the center of the Earth) of 0°, 90°, 180°, and 270° respectively. Hindu astrology also considers significant the changes in the phase of the moon even during the course of each individual day.

== New moon ==
The first of these principal phases is Amāvásyā (Sanskrit: अमावस्या), the day of the new moon.

== Paksha fortnights ==
The second and fourth phases (the quarters) are less significant, marking only the midpoints of the Paksha (Sanskrit: पक्ष, romanized: pakṣa), the fourteen days on either side of the full moon. There are two pakshas: the first is the 'brightening' (Shukla) of the moon, as it changes from new to full; the second is the 'darkening' (Krishna), as it changes from full to new.

The first day of a paksha is called a Pratipada (Sanskrit: प्रतिपदा, romanized: Pratipadā) or Prathama (Sanskrit: प्रथमा, romanized: Prathamā) and thus there are two of these days (the first and usually the fifteenth of the lunar month).

== Full moon ==
The third phase is Pūrṇimā (Sanskrit: पूर्णिमा), the day of the full moon.

== Calendrical significance ==
In the pūrṇimānta māna Hindu lunisolar calendar used in most parts of the Indian subcontinent, the lunar month starts on the day following the full moon and therefore Amāvásyā always falls in the middle of the month. However, in the amānta māna calendar used in some places, the lunar month starts on the day of the new moon, making Amāvásyā the last day of the lunar month in those places. Many festivals, the most famous being Diwali (lit. 'the festival of lights'), are observed on Amāvásyā.

== Tithi: lunar phase change in a single day ==
The astronomical basis of the Hindu lunar day

In Vedic timekeeping, a tithi is a "duration of two faces of moon that is observed from earth". Every day of a lunar month is called tithi. This concept is significant in astrology as it maps to the moment of birth.

== See also ==
- Hindu calendar
  - Astronomical basis of the Hindu calendar

" Jantar Mantar – Five early C18 observatories in India
