= Tarpana =

Offering in Vedic practice

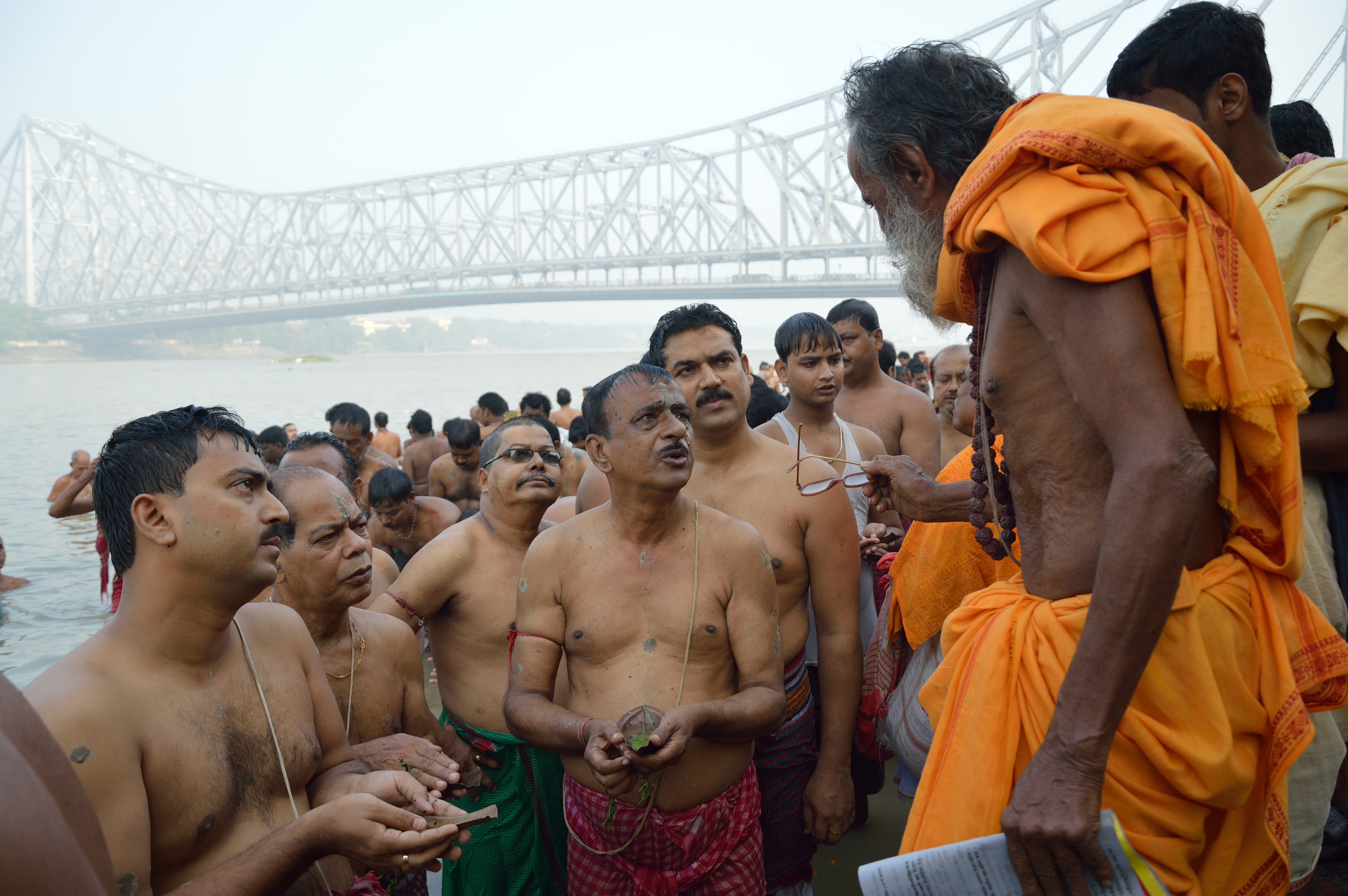
The Tarpan (Offering holy water to the manes) is being done at the Jagannath Ghat, Kolkata, at end of the Pitru Paksha.

Tarpana or Tarpaṇa (Sanskrit: तर्पण, Bengali: তর্পণ, Kannada: ತರ್ಪಣ, Tamil: தர்ப்பணம்) is a term in the Vedic practice that refers to an offering made to divine entities. It refers to the act of offering as well as the substance used in the offering. Tilatarpana (तिलतर्पण, তিলতর্পণ, ತಿಲತರ್ಪಣ, திலதர்பணம்) is a specific form of tarpana involving libations offered to the pitri (deceased ancestors) using water and sesame seeds during Pitru Paksha or as a death rite.

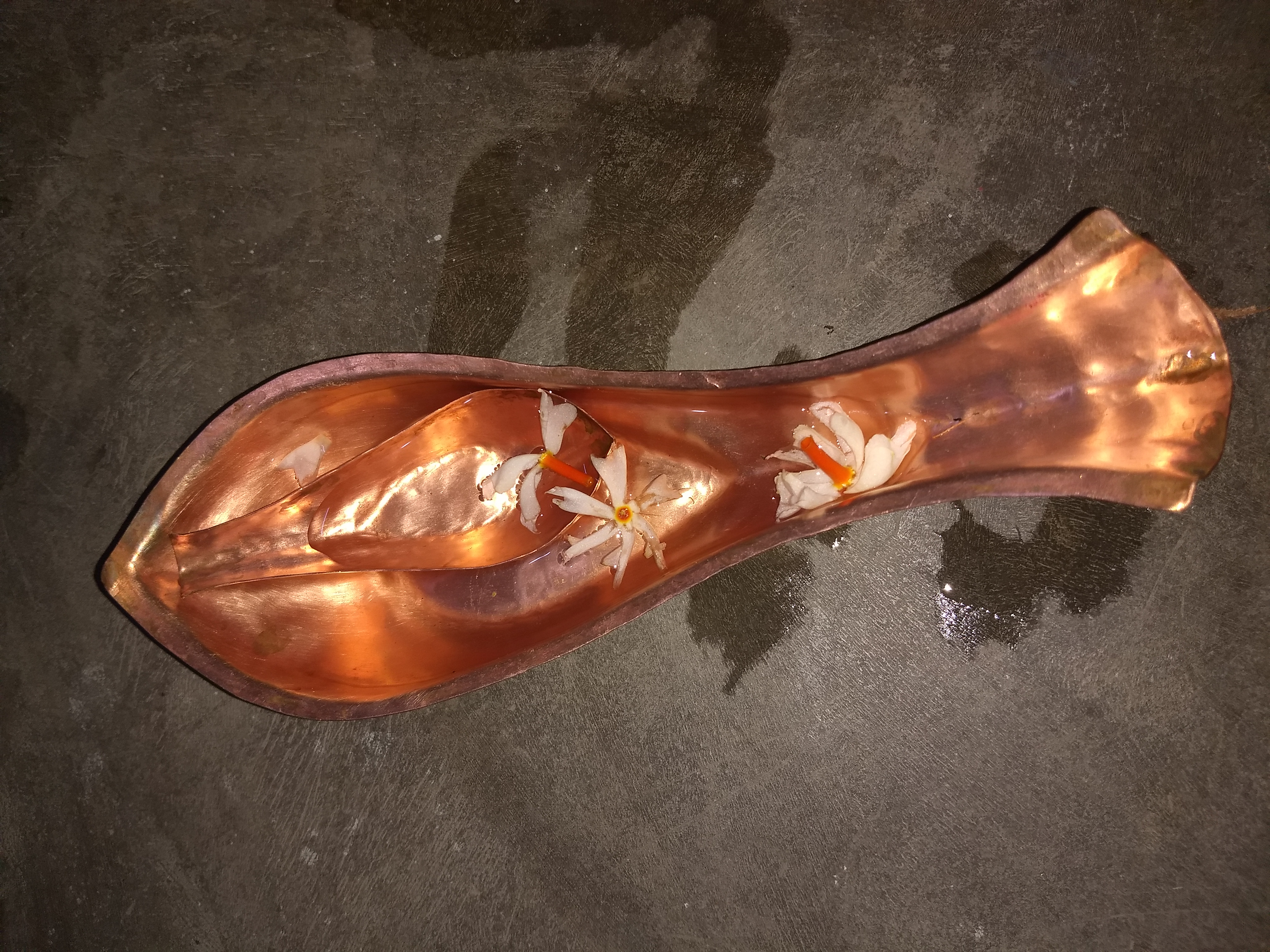
Kosha Kushi (Bengali: কোশা-কুশী; lit. 'Double Spoon') is used for puja. This Kosha Kushi is made of pure copper. Kosha Kushi is used for offering holy water to God and Goddess and also used for shradh tarpan puja. Kosha Kushi is an important ritual item used in the Tantric worship of the Divine Mother.

Tarpana is a form of arghya (an offering). It is offered to all devas as well as the Navagrahas whenever mulamantra is recited as japa. The ritual uses hand positions (tirthas) to direct the flow of water to gods, sages, or ancestors.

== Instances of welcome tarpana ==
For devis:

- for Lakshmi, “आर्द्रां ज्वलंतीम् तृप्ताम् तर्पयन्तीम्” Ārdrāṁ jvalantīm tr̥ptām tarpayantīm (Śrī Sūkta 4), "One who is satisfied and who satisfies those who offer Her Tarpana"
- for Tripura Sundari, “बिंदु तर्पण संतुष्टाम् पूर्वजा त्रिपुराम्बिका” bindu tarpaṇa santuṣṭām pūrvajā tripurāmbikā (Lalita Sahasranama 178, 974), "One who is satisfied by just a single drop of Tarpana"

Cow's milk (raw, unheated, and unpasteurized), water, sugar, saffron, cardamom, borneo-camphor, etc. are mixed and used as the offering.

One tarpana (or arghya) is offered for the recitation of every ten mulamantras and one for part thereof.

== Tilatarpana ==
Tilatarpana is the tarpana (or arghya) offered to pitrs (departed ancestors) by male descendants who do not have a living father. This is offered at the first annual shraddha (death anniversary) and during subsequent annual shraddhas, amavasyas (new moon days), sankramanas (solar ingresses), eclipses, and during visits to selected holy places of pilgrimage.

=== Offering tilatarpana ===
- Black tila (gingelly) seeds, used along with water as the offering.
- The yagnopavita (sacred thread) is to be worn in the opposing position (i.e., on the right shoulder, which is termed as prāchīnāvīti, प्राचीनावीति or apsabhya in Sanskrit).
- A pavitra (ring) made of kusha grass should be worn on the ring finger of the right hand and kusha grasses in left fingers horizontally called tekusha.

== Posture of hand ==
The hand while offering tarpana varies for offerings made to devas (Gods, Goddesses and Navagrahas), rishis (sages) and pitrus (departed ancestors).

(a) For devas, the offering is made to flow over the eight fingers of both hands adjoined together other than the thumb known as dev tirtha
(b) For rishis, the offering is made to flow between both palms adjoined, the tarpan dripping between both palms known as rishi tirtha
(c) For pitrus, the offering is made to flow over the left side of the left palm and the thumb of the left hand known as pitru tirtha, the janeu or yagnopavita resting on right shoulder falling to left side on the hip. This is known as upsavya as the yagnopavita is resting on the left side so the pitru tarpan should be offered with the left hand. This is the reason to circumambulate the deceased anti-clockwise. The left hand should be used for pind danam. In all other rituals apart from pitru shraddha, the use of the right hand is compulsory.

== Gingelly ==
Gingelly is different than sesame, which is from a large tree; gingelly is a small seed that stores energy and hence is considered a favorite of all Devas, Shani (Saturn) and pitrus. Ganesha is commonly offered pancha-kajjaya, a delicacy made using sesame. Shiva is worshipped with sesame seeds (tilakshata). For Vishnu, Brahma, Laxmi and Saraswati, gingelly seeds are used in their favorite eatables. It is used as a homa dravya (an ingredient in the fire offerings) in many havans and homas. Therefore, tila (gingelly) and tilatarpana should not be dismissed as inauspicious.

== Reasons for offering tarpana ==
It is believed that one's pitrs eagerly await tarpana. If no offering is made, they return to their places disappointed, and the descendant misses their blessings that he would have received, if he had performed his filial duties. Kosha Kushi is an important ritual item used in the Tantric worship of the Divine Mother and represents the yoni and womb of the Goddess, as well as the astral body within the physical body and the microcosm within the macrocosm.

== Bibliography ==
- Tarpana Vidhi Vidhana, authored by Sri Gunjur Ramachandra Sastry, published by Srinidhi Prakashana, Bangalore 560053 INDIA
- The Sacred Books of the Hindus, Chapter 4, pg 21
