= Madhu Purnima =

Theravadin Buddhist festival

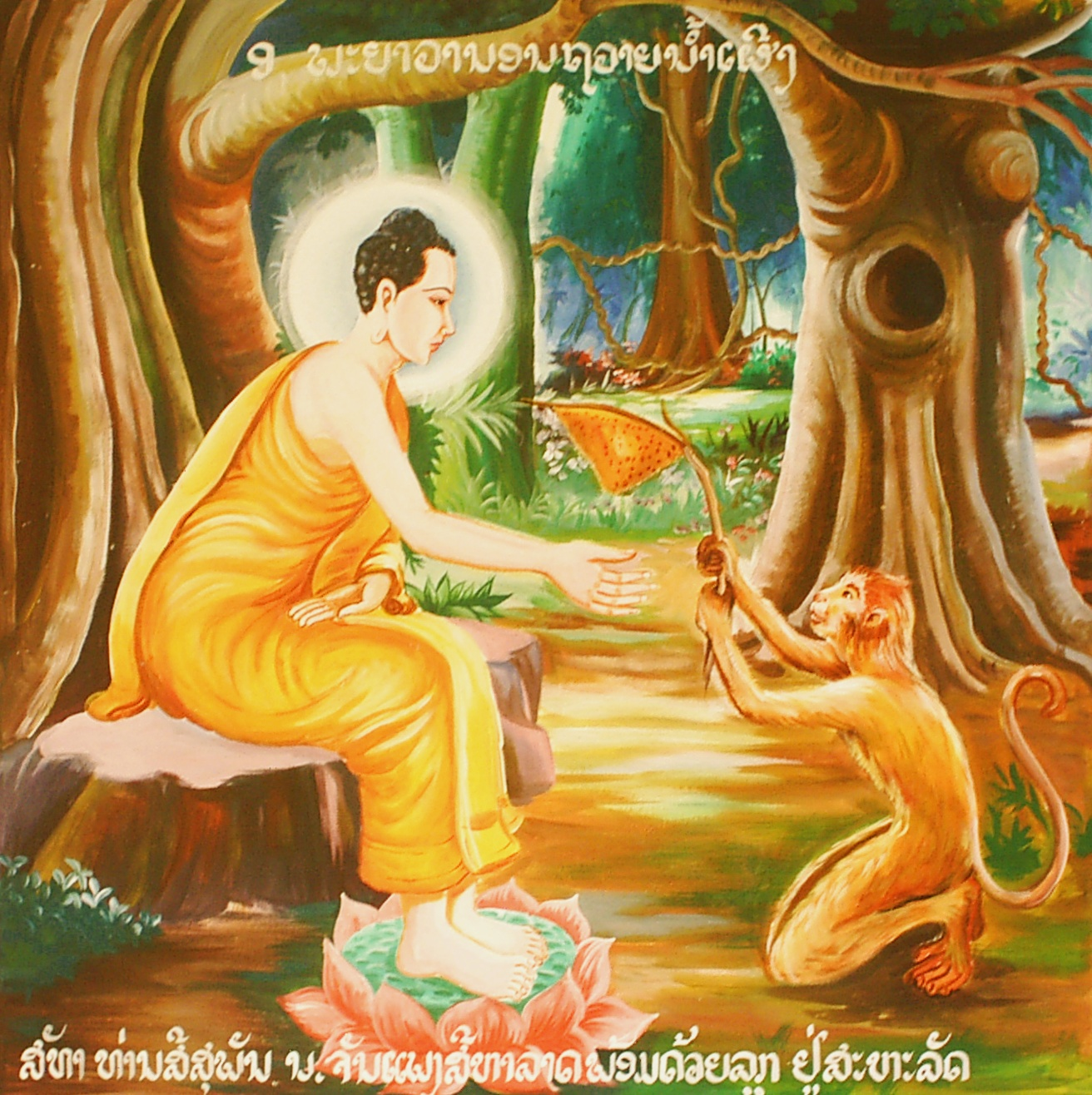
Painting from Laos

Madhu Purnima (Sanskrit: मधुपुर्णिमा, romanized: Madhupurṇimā, lit. 'honey full-moon'), also known as Honey Full Moon Festival or Honey-offering Festival, is a Buddhist festival celebrated in Bangladesh by the Barua and Chakma people of Chittagong and by the Mon people of Thailand. It occurs on the day of the full moon in the Bangla month of Bhadro (August/September).

== History ==
The day commemorates an occasion on which the Buddha retreated to the wilderness of Parileyya forest to bring peace between two quarrelling factions of disciples. According to legend, a monkey and an elephant named Parileyyaka fed him during this time, the elephant bringing fruit and the monkey bringing a honeycomb. The monkey was so excited when the Buddha accepted his gift that he began leaping from tree to tree and fell to his death. However, he was immediately reborn in Tavatimsa as a result of his generosity.

On this day, the Bhikkhus of Kosambi ended the disunity in their ranks and went to the Buddha in the forest to take a vow of unity and cooperation. In his sermon, Buddha pointed to the elephant and said, "This elephant lives alone in the forest in the absence of a proper partner. If you do not get associates with wisdom and high thoughts, it is better to live alone in this world, for foolish associates will only increase your suffering."

After the rains retreat the monks who had split into two groups agreed to make up their differences because the local lay people were not making any offerings to them. The monks sent a representative to see the Buddha and invite him to go back to the city. The elephant palilayaka was heartbroken to see the Buddha go, and followed him out of the forest, and even made as if he would follow the Buddha into the city. The Buddha turned to him and said, "Palilayaka. This is the limits of your territory. From here on is the territory of man, which are a great danger to animals such as you. You cannot come with me! Palilayaka the elephant stood and roared in grief, but did not dare follow the Buddha. As soon as the Buddha was out of sight, his heart broke and he died right there. The texts state that the elephant and the monkey, after dying at that time, were reborn as devas in the Tavatimsa heaven.

== Celebration ==
Modhu Purnima is celebrated as a joyous day of unity and charity. All Buddhists observe it by bringing gifts of honey and fruit to shrines or monasteries.
