= Chithirai =

- Native name: Chittirai
- Calendar: Tamil calendar
- Month number: 1
- Number of days: 30 or 31
- Season: Ila-venil (Spring)
- Gregorian equivalent: April–May
- Significant days: Chitra Pournami; Puthandu

Chithirai is the first month of the Tamil calendar. The name of the month is derived from the position of the Moon near the Chittirai nakshatra (star) on the pournami (full moon) day. The month corresponds to ila-venil (spring) season and falls in April–May in the Gregorian calendar.

In the Hindu lunar calendar, it corresponds to the first month of Chaitra, falling in the Gregorian months of March–April.

In the Hindu solar calendar, it corresponds to the first month of Mesha and begins with the Sun's entry into Aries.

In the Vaishnav calendar, it corresponds to the first month of Visnu.

== Festivals ==
The first day of the month is celebrated as the Tamil New Year's Day, known as Puthandu by the Tamils.

Chitra Pournami is observed on the Pournami (full moon day) of the month. It is dedicated to Chitragupta, the divine accountant for Yama. People take a holy bath in rivers or temple tanks on this day to cleanse the sins of the past. Other rituals include special pujas to Indra, offerings of rice, and Kavadi Attam dedicated to Murugan.

== See also ==
- Astronomical basis of the Hindu calendar
- Hindu astronomy
