= Bisu Parba =

Indian festival

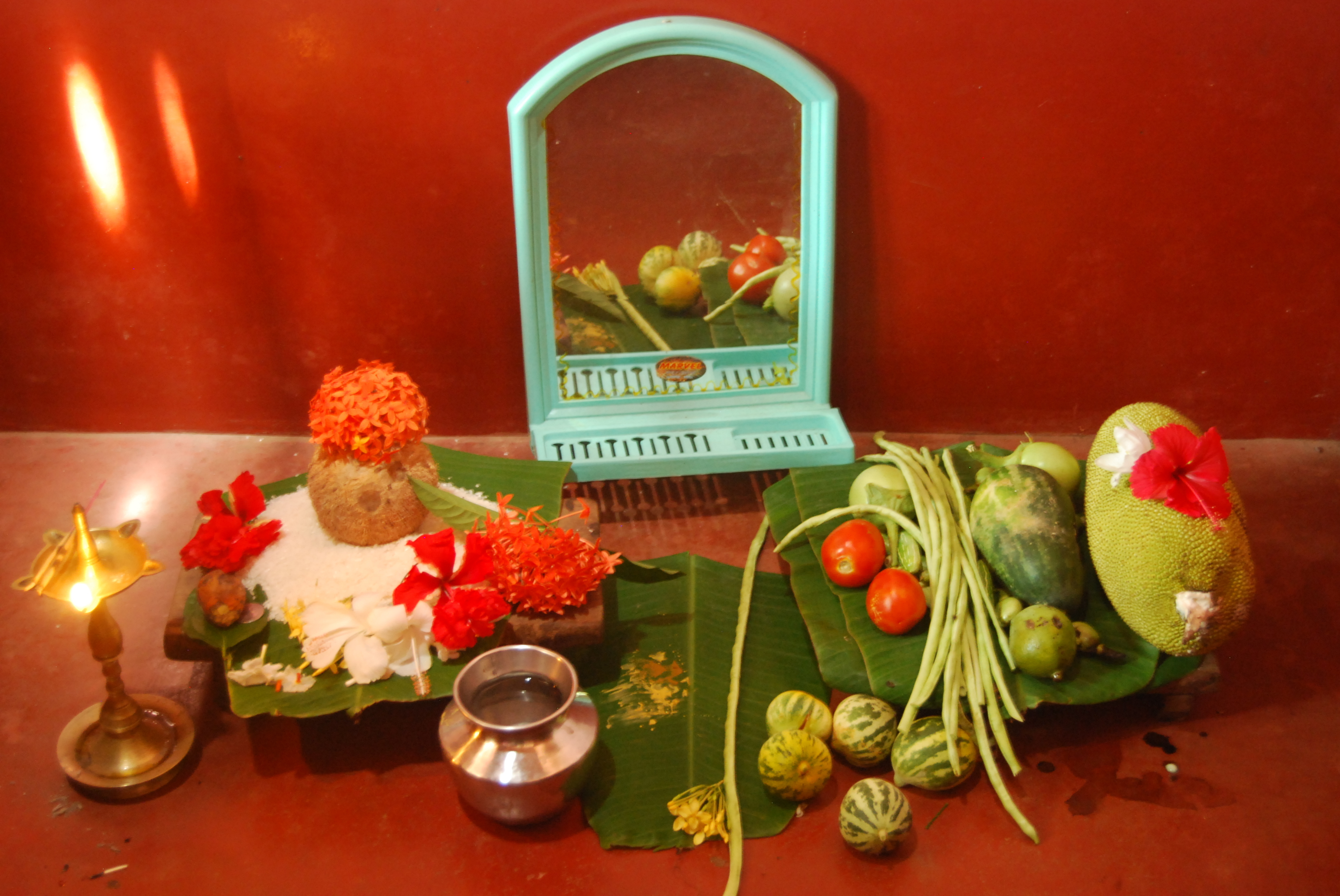
- Bisu Kani at Puttur
- Official name: Bisu Parba
- Observed by: Tuluvas
- Type: Religious, Social
- Observances: Bisu kani Bisu Parbo
- Begins: dawn
- Ends: after 24 hours
- 2025 date: Mon, 14 April
- 2026 date: Wed, 15 April
- Related to: South and Southeast Asian solar New Year

Bisu Parba is a new year and harvest festival of Tulunadu. It marks the first day of Paggu, which is the first month of Tulu calendar. It falls in the middle of April in the Gregorian calendar, on 14 or 15 April every year.

== Background ==
For residents of Tulunadu, this is a significant annual festival. It is a kind of worshipping nature. According to popular belief, today is lucky for starting new ventures. The people of Tulunadu celebrate the Bisu festival as a symbol of prosperity from the past year and hope to prosper throughout the upcoming year. This festival is known as "Bisu Parba" in Tulunadu.

== Celebration ==
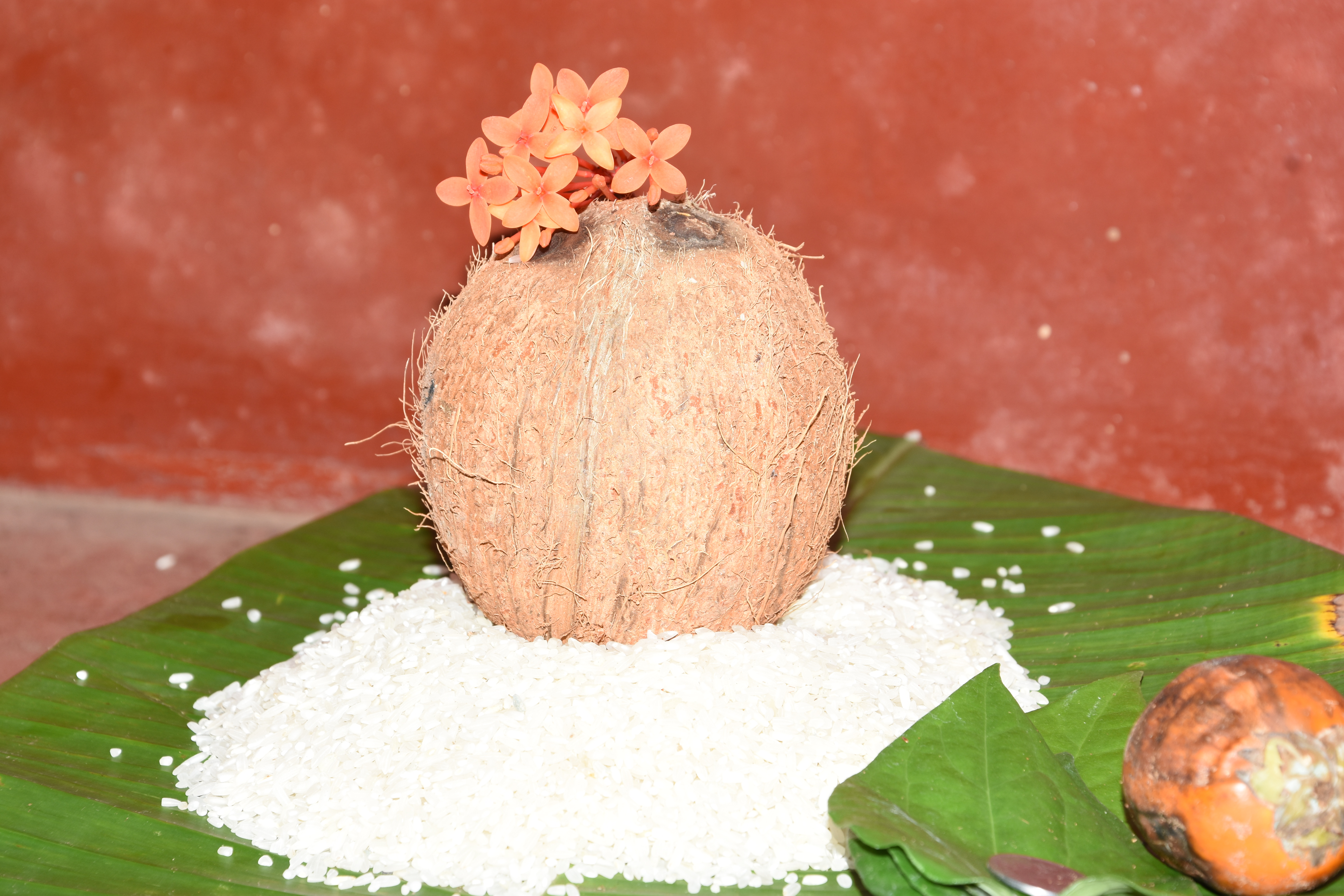
Suthye Dipuna

Get up early in the morning on the day of the feast and put it on the bed in the chamber of God or in the hall. Light the foot lamp and put it in two ends, keep banana leaves and place one cup of rice, two betel leaves, one semi de-husked coconut with muganda, a bunch of Ixora coccinea (also known as jungle geranium Tulu: Kepula poo) stick of sandalwood, and wet the sandalwood. This process is called suthye dipuna. In front of this suthye, grown vegetables, flowers, hinges, fruits, gold ornaments, mirrors are also placed.

=== Blessings of the elder ===
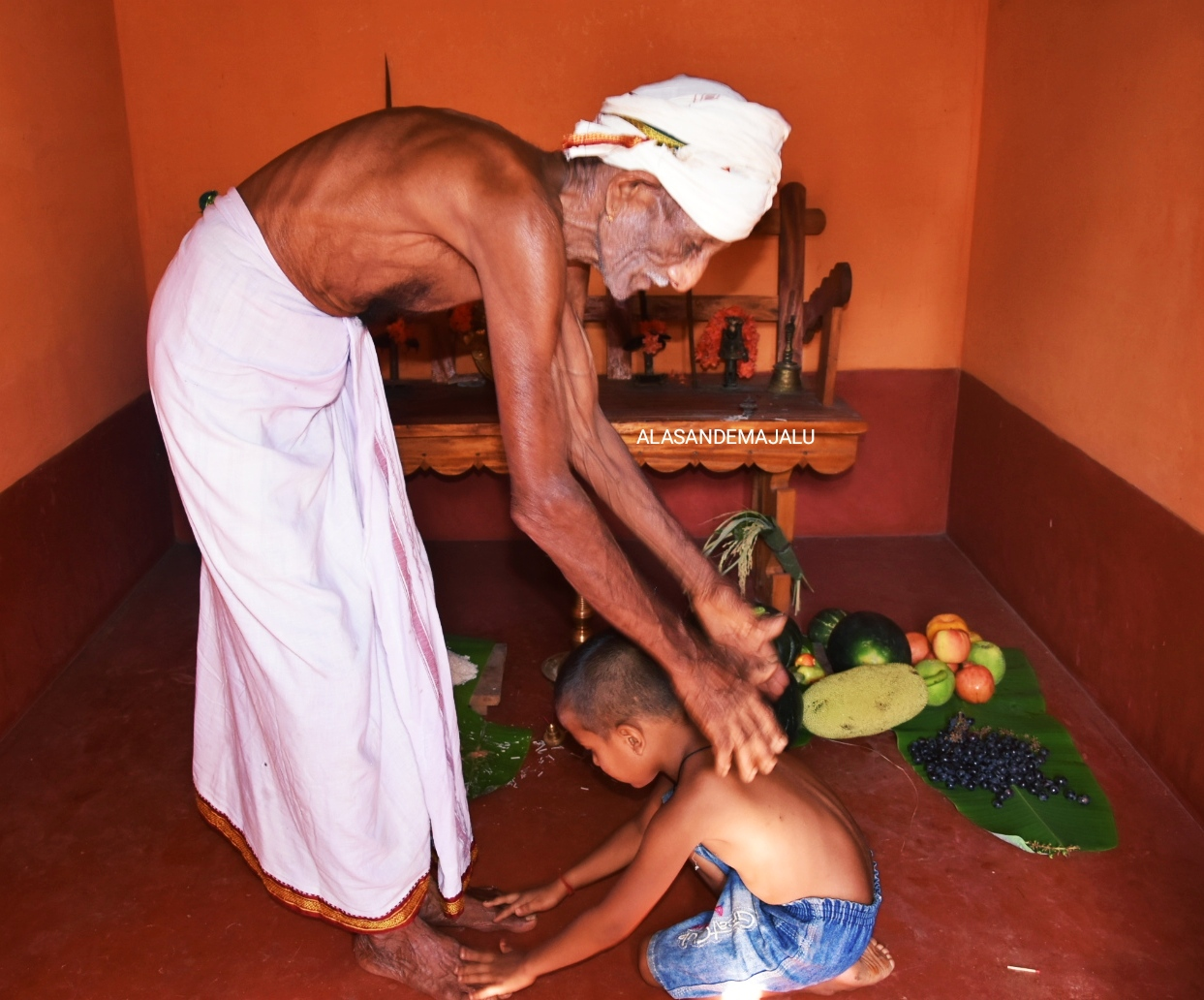
To Prostrate and take blessing from elders in front of Bisukani

All the householders pray together and worship God in front of the Bisu Kani. They reconcile with family members as well as strengthen relationships between seniors and juniors. The juniors receive the blessings of the elders on this occasion. Touching the feet of elders is an age-old Indian tradition that is considered to be a mark of respect as well as a blessing. This gesture can be seen in almost all Tuluva families on this occasion. The elders of the house give money to all the minors and they enjoy the feast. Every year, it is a source of good fortune. As part of the Bisu festival, special worship is held in daivaradane chavadi, temples and the sacrificial festival of God. It is common to prepare and enjoy a traditional dish for this special day. Everybody has to go to every house and enjoy the food with the blessings of the elders. The owner of the house puts the Bisu kaṇi (arrangement of fruits and vegetables) on the roof of the house.

== Bisu Kani ==
The festivals in Tulunadu highlight the farmer's life and his affinity with the land he tills. On the day of the feast, bed of wooden in the chamber of God, daiva or in the hall. Light the foot lamp and put it in two ends, banana leaves placed on floor or bed of wooden is accommodate one pot of water, one cup of rice, two betel leaves, one semi dehusked coconut(with muganda), a bunch of Ixora coccinea (also known as jungle geranium Tulu: Kepula poo) stick of sandalwood, and wet the sandalwood which totally called suthye dipuna. In front of this suthye grown vegetables, flowers, hinges, fruits, gold ornaments, mirrors. tenants were taking the grown vegetables to his boss (Tulu: Danikulu) such as brinjal, cucumber, sambar southe, pumpkin, ivy gourd, long yard beans, bottle gourd, okra, and fruits such as jackfruit, banana, cashew apple, jambu nerale, mango, pineapple. Arecanut and coconut, the part and parcel of local life, was also part of the Kani.

== Bisu Parba recipe ==
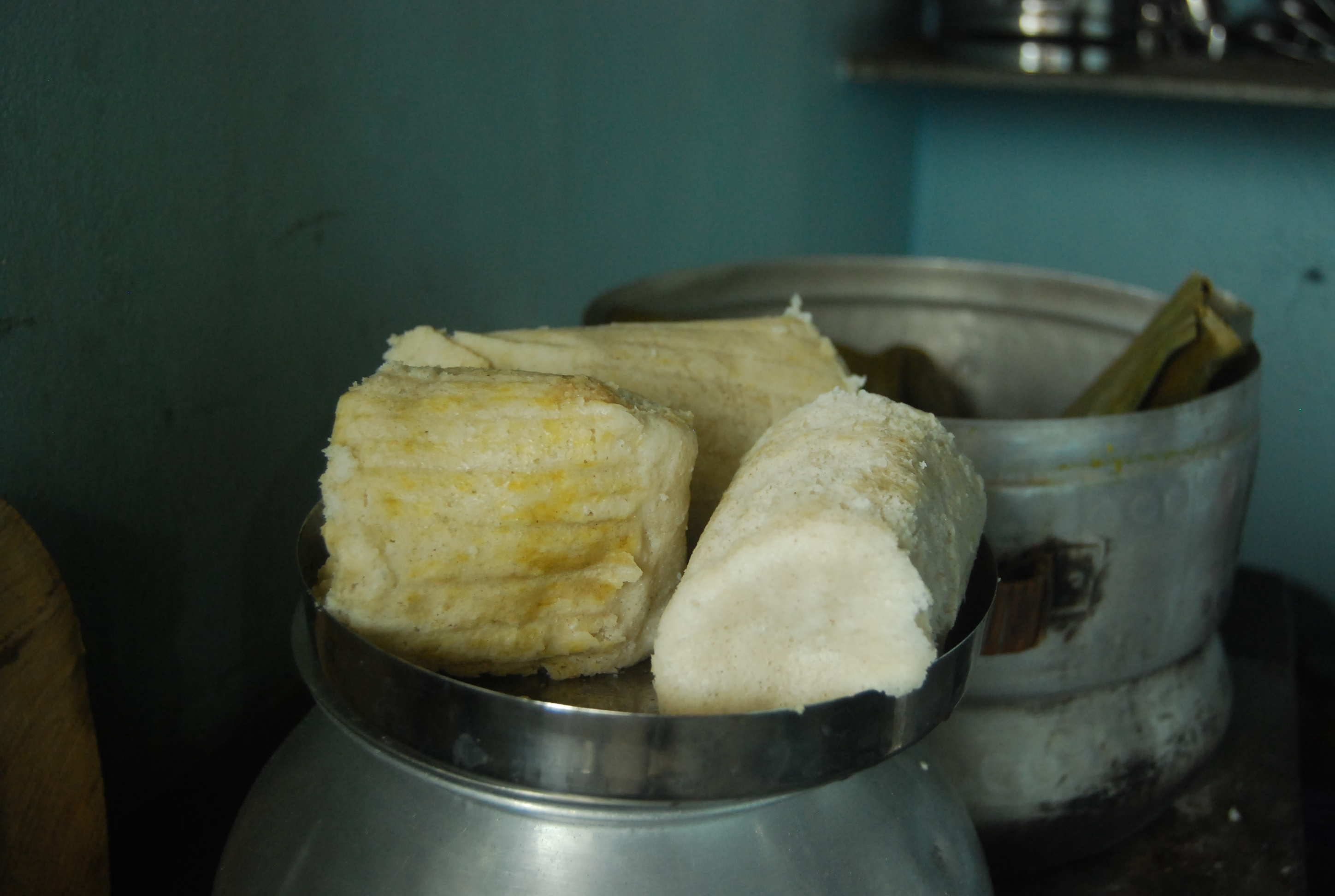
Moode

On the occasion of Bisu people are resting at home and preparing special food for breakfast on the day which is mostly "Moode recipe" (English: Screw Pine) which is similar to Kadubu and "Uddina dōse recipe" (lentil dosa). For lunch, cashew nut and green gram curry (bijata kajipu), cucumber puli kajipu, ivy gourd dry palya fries and Payaso is served with steamed boiled rice and other accompaniments. Prepare a Tuluva inspired brunch this "Bisu Parba" and enjoy with the members of the family.

== Kai Bittu Padune ==
Bisu parbo is auspious day for Tuluvas, so on this day morning they keep a side new paddy seeds. In the evening sowing procedure is carried out on the chin(Tulu:Puṇi) of field. Put the paddy seed on the side of the mulch and shade it with Aporosa villosa (Tulu: Saroli) leaves. And tenants take permission for continuing the practice of planting the following year.

== Related festivals ==
In adjacent Malabar region a festival called Vishu with similar customs and ritual significance that of Bisu Parba is celebrated on the same date. Spring harvest festivals such as Bihu, Vaisakhi, Puthandu etc. too coincides with Bisu Parba.

== See also ==
- Keddaso
- Pattanaje
- Koral Parba
