= Subramaniasamy Temple, Ettukkudi =

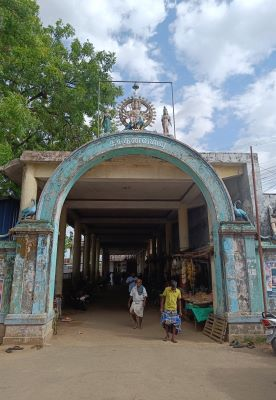
Entrance arch

The Subramaniasamy Temple is a Hindu temple dedicated to Murugan located at Ettukkudi in Nagapattinam district in Tamil Nadu, India.

== Location ==
The temple is located in Tiruvarur-Vedaranyam route at a distance of 25 km from Tiruvarur. This temple can be reached at a distance of 2 km. from Seeravattam palam in Nagapattinam-Thiruthuraipoondi road.

== Shrines ==
The shrines of Ganapathi, Juradeva, Srinivasa Soundiraraja Perumal, Anjaneya, Manonmani, Ayyappan, Mahalakshmi. Navagrahas, Shani and Bhairava. A Siddha known as Vanmeeka attained samathi here. In the sanctum sanctorum Muruga is found, flanked by Valli and Deivanai, sitting on a peacock. The base for the sculpture is the two legs of the peacock. In the right side of Muruga shrine, the shrine of Soundhiresvarar and in the left the shrine of the goddess Anandavalli Amman is found. In front of the temple, the temple tank is found.

== Festivals ==
Observing the Sashti Vradha and Gowri Vradha simultaneously is considered auspicious in this temple. Chitra Pournami (festival), Kandha Sashti, festivals throughout the Tamil month of Vaikasi and special pujas in the Tamil month of Karthikai are celebrated in this temple.

== Worshipping time ==
This temple is open for worship from 4.30 a.m. to 12.00 noon and from 4.30 p.m. to 8.30 p.m.

== Photogallery ==
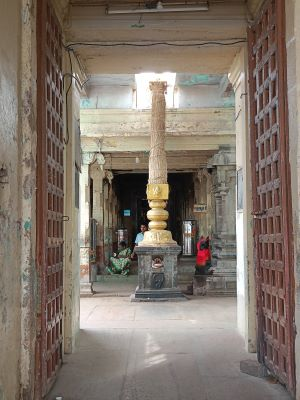
Flagpost

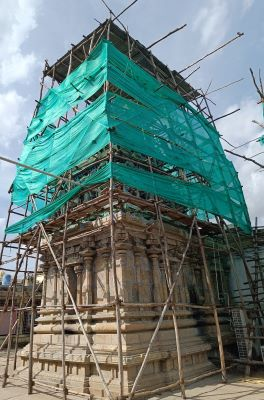
Vimana of the presiding deity

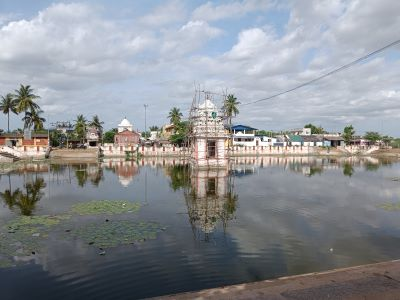
Temple tank

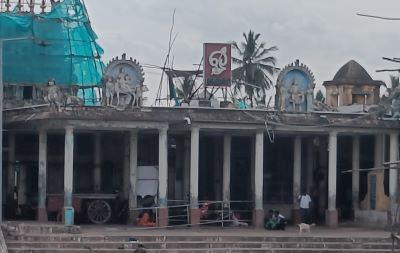
Entrance

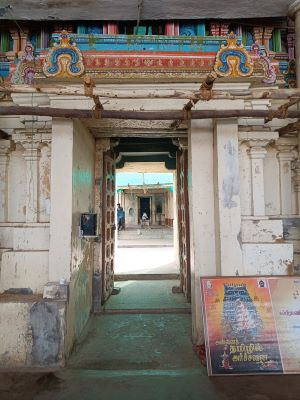
Entrance to Soundhiresvarar shrine

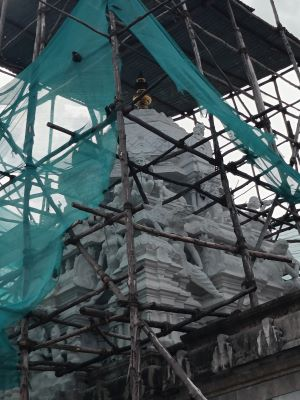
Vimana of the Soundhiresvarar shrine
