= Chitragupta temple =

Chitragupta temple may refer to:

- Chitragupta temple, Kanchipuram
- Chitragupta temple, Khajuraho
