= Ausabandhi =

- village
- Location in West Bengal, India Ausabandhi (India)
- Coordinates: 22°49′01.15″N 87°25′09.38″E
- Country: India
- State: West Bengal

Languages
  - Official: Bengali, English
- Time zone: UTC+5:30 (IST)

Ausabandhi is a village in Paschim Medinipur (West Midnapore) district under Garbeta - III Block in the West Bengal state in India.

It is famous for the annual three-day religious festival called Salui. This festival is an important festival for the native Adivasis and commences with Purnima Tithi (full moon day) of the Chaitra month in the Bengali calendar year.
