= Chaitra =

First month of the Hindu calendar

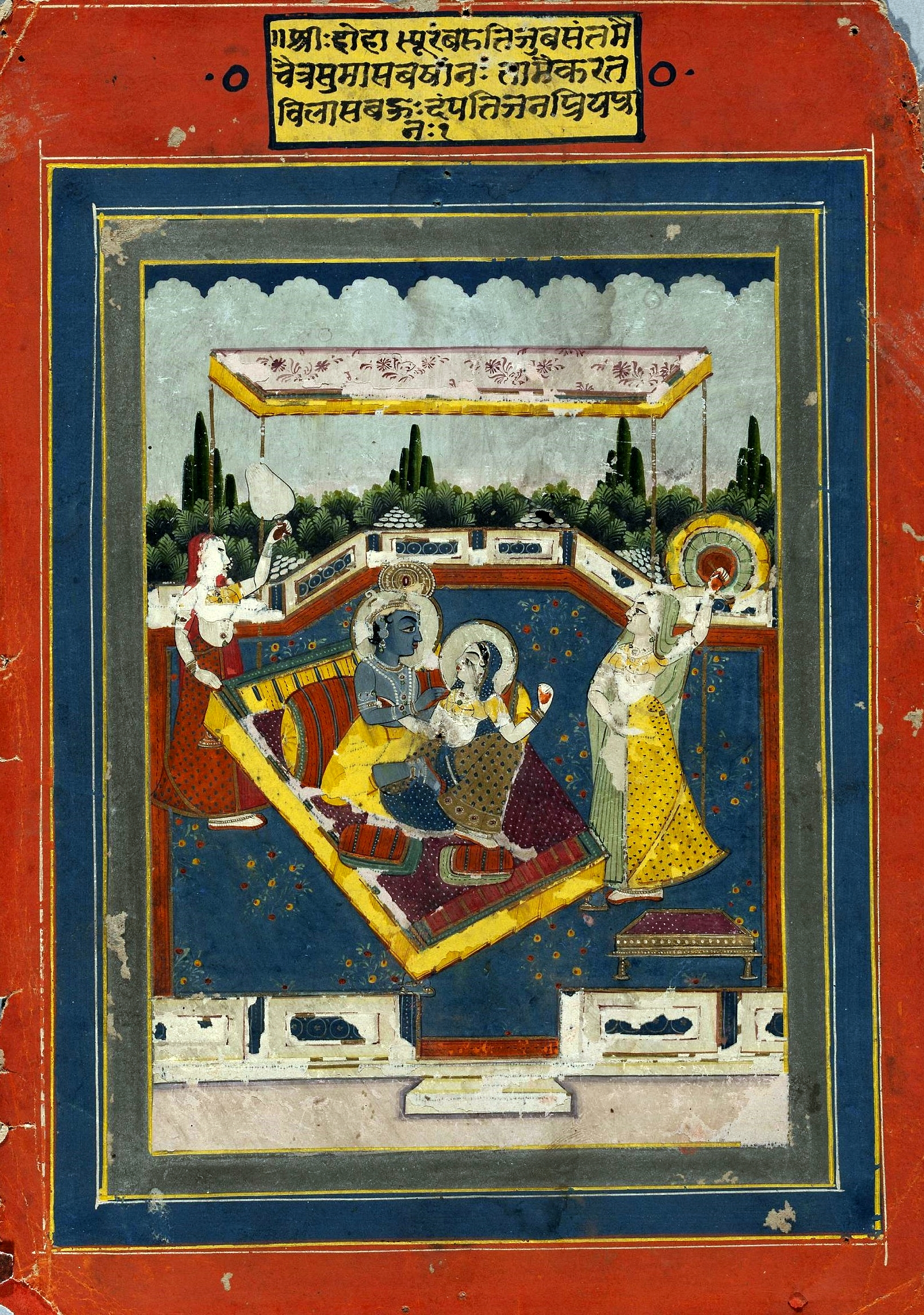
- Krishna with his beloved in the month of Chaitra, a Jaipur miniature painting from the National Museum, Warsaw
- Native name: चैत्र (Sanskrit)
- Calendar: Hindu calendar
- Month number: 1
- Number of days: 29 or 30
- Season: Vasanta (Spring)
- Gregorian equivalent: March–April
- Significant days: Chaitra Navaratri; Chitra Pournami; Gudi Padwa; Hanuman Jayanti; Puthandu; Rama Navami; Ugadi

Chaitra (Sanskrit: चैत्र, romanized: Caitra) is the first month of the Hindu lunar calendar and the Indian national calendar. The name of the month is derived from the position of the Moon near the Chitra nakshatra (star) on the full moon day. The month corresponds to spring (Vasanta) season and falls in March–April in the Gregorian calendar.

In the Hindu solar calendar, it corresponds to the last month of Mina and begins with the Sun's entry into Pisces. It corresponds to Choitro, the last month in the Bengali calendar, and Chait, the last month in the Nepali calendar (Vikram Samvat). In the Tamil calendar, it corresponds to the third month of Chittirai, falling in the Gregorian months of April–May.

In the Sindhi lunisolar calendar, the first month is referred to as Chet and is marked by the celebration of the Cheti Chand (birth of Jhulelal, an incarnation of Vishnu). In the Vaishnav calendar, it corresponds to the first month of Visnu.

In the Hindu lunar calendar, each month has 29 or 30 days. The month begins on the next day after Amavasya (new moon) or Purnima (full moon) as per amanta and purnimanta systems respectively. A month consists of two cycles of 15 days each, Shukla Paksha (waxing moon) and Krishna Paksha (waning moon). Days in each cycle is labeled as a thithi, with each thithi repeating twice in a month.

== Festivals ==
The first day of the month is celebrated as the Hindu New Year's Day, known as Gudi Padwa in Gujarat and Maharashtra, Puthandu in Tamil Nadu, Vishu in Kerala, and Ugadi in Karnataka, Telangana, and Andhra Pradesh. In West Bengal, Basanti Puja, Annapurna Puja, Ram Navami, Neel Puja, and Chorok Puja are held consecutively before the beginning of Bengali New Year on Poila Baishakh.

The month is also associated with the departure of spring. Holi, the Hindu spring festival of colours, is celebrated on the full moon day (Purnima) of Phalguna, the month before Chaitra, exactly six days after which the Chaiti form of the Chhath festival is observed. Ram Navami, which commemorates the birth of the Hindu god Rama, is celebrated on Navami (ninth lunar day) thithi of the Shukla Paksha (waxing moon) of the month. Hanuman Jayanti, dedicated to Hanuman, is observed on the Purnima day of the month.

Chitra Pournami is observed on the full moon day (Pournami) of the Tamil month of Chithirai (April–May) and is dedicated to Chitragupta, the divine accountant for Yama. People take a holy bath in rivers or temple tanks on this day to cleanse the sins of the past. Other rituals include special pujas to Indra, offerings of rice, and Kavadi Attam dedicated to Murugan.

In lunar calendar, Chaitra begins with the new moon day and is the first month of the year. The first day of Chaitra is marked as the Chaitra Navaratri, the lunar new year. Navadurga (nine forms of the goddess Durga) starts from Chaitra Shukla Pratipada.

According to Jain texts, Mahavira was born on the thirteenth day of the bright half of the moon in the month of Chaitra in 599 BCE (Chaitra Sud 13). Jains celebrate Mahavir Janma Kalyanak commemorating the same.

== See also ==
- Astronomical basis of the Hindu calendar
- Chitragupta
- Hindu astronomy
- Jyotish
- Nisan
