= Chitragupta temple, Kanchipuram =

Chitragupta Temple
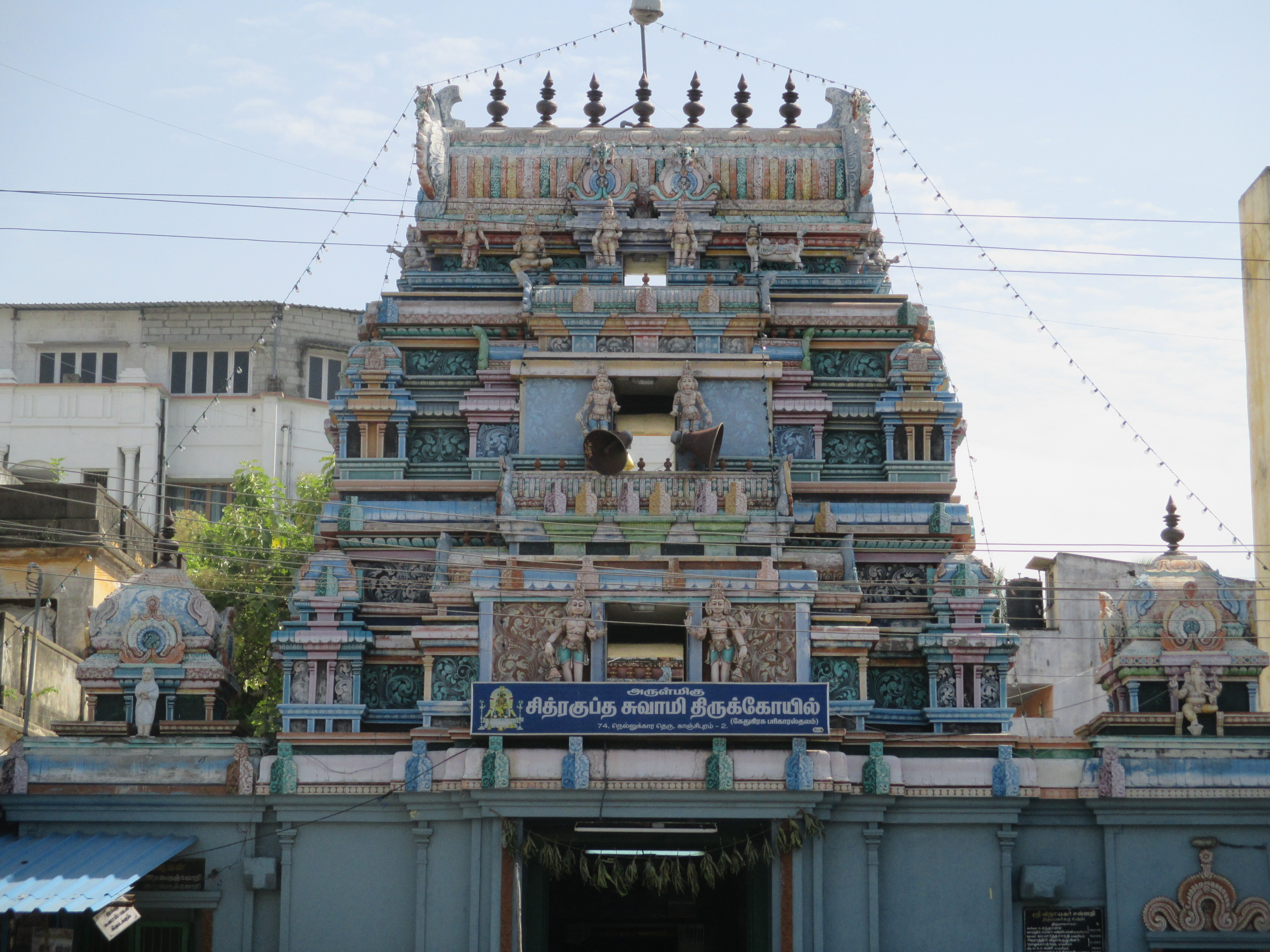

Religion
- Affiliation: Hinduism
- District: Kanchipuram
- Deity: Chitragupta

Location
- Location: Kanchipuram
- State: Tamil Nadu
- Country: India
- Interactive map of Chitragupta Temple
- Coordinates: 12°50′12″N 79°42′17″E

Architecture
- Type: Dravidian architecture
- Creator: Chola kings
- Completed: 9th century CE

Chitragupta temple is a Hindu temple located in Nellukara Street Kanchipuram in the South Indian state of Tamil Nadu. It is one of the rare temples of the Hindu deity Chitragupta, considered to be the assistant of Yama, the Hindu god of death. Chitragupta is believed to have emerged from a painting and set as the accountant of good and bad deeds of human beings by Brahma. The temple has a three-tiered Rajagopuram (gateway tower) and a single precinct around the sanctum.

The present masonry structure was built during the Chola dynasty in the 9th century CE, while later expansions are attributed to various others. The temple is maintained and administered by the Hindu Religious and Charitable Endowments Department of the Government of Tamil Nadu. The major festival celebrated in the temple in Chitra Pournami during April. The temple is one of the most prominent tourist attractions in the city.

== Legend ==
As per Hindu legend, Shiva, the Hindu god of destruction was discussing with his wife Parvathi about maintaining Dharma amidst all human beings in earth and maintaining good account of their deeds. He felt that he wanted to have someone to have a close watch on the people to prevent them from indulging in crime and involving themselves in good deeds. Shiva drew a picture in a gold plate - Parvathi was impressed and wanted Shiva to detail it. The picture turned into a deity by the divine grace of Shiva and Parvathi. Shiva entrusted the duty of maintaining the account of deeds of all human beings in earth. He came to be known as Chitragupta as he was derived from a Chitra (picture) and Gupta (with secrecy). He was set as the accountant of Yama, who is the Hindu deity of death.

As per another legend, Brihaspati, the Guru of planetary deities had a disagreement with Indra, the king of celestial deities. On account of the confrontation, Brihaspati discontinued his advocacy to Indra. At a later point, Indra realized his mistakes and patched up with his Guru. To expiate himself from the sins created, he started on a pilgrimage and reached the place to find a Linga. He constructed a temple in the place and golden lotuses started appearing in the nearby temple tank. The day was Chitra Pournami.

A third legend states that Indra prayed to Shiva to have a child, but as per the divine wish, his wife Indrani was not supposed have any progeny. Shiva directed Kamadhenu, the holy cow to give birth to a child. Shiva later entrusted the child to Indra and Indrani, who later brought him up as Chitragupta.

== Architecture and history ==
The temple has a three-tiered rajagopuram, the gateway tower. The central shrine has the image of Chitragupta in seated posture. He is sported with a ezhuthaani (pen) in his right hand and scripts in his left hand.

Archaeologist have confirmed based on the inscriptions that the temple was built during the 9th century CE by the Medieval Cholas. The temple has various maintenance activities during the subsequent period. During the repair works carried out during 1911, two historical metal idols of Chitragupta and his consort Karnikambal were found. These images are housed in the central sanctum. During modern times, a consecration was performed during 1918 and 1994. The temple has been administered by a group of hereditary trustees.

== Religious importance ==
Chitragupta, as per Hinduism is the accountant of Yama, the death god, who keeps track of good and bad deeds of human beings to decide their residence in heaven or hell. The temple is just one of its kind that has a separate temple for Chitragupta. Every new moon, there are special worship practices followed in the temple. The major festival celebrated in the temple in Chitra Pournami during April. Chitragupta is considered the Adidevata for Ketu, the ninth planet of Hindu astrology. He is the patron and central deity of the Kayastha community, who are known as the descendant of Shri Chitragupt, but is also worshipped by both Shaivites and Vaishnavites. Women devotees observe fast or consume food without salt during the day to seek blessings of Chitragupta. During old times, traditional village accountants worship god seeking divine blessings for their profession.
