= Pattanaje =

Tulu celebration

Pattanaje (Tulu: ಪತ್ತನಾಜೆ/Pattanāje) is a one-day celebration of the end of the festival season in Tulunadu, India. The people of Tulunadu have their own religious and social deadlines for all kinds of festivals. It is a fixed-day celebration which falls on the tenth day of the second solar month called Besha (Besha Patth) in the regional calendar of Tuluva, generally on 24 or 25 May of each year.

== About ==
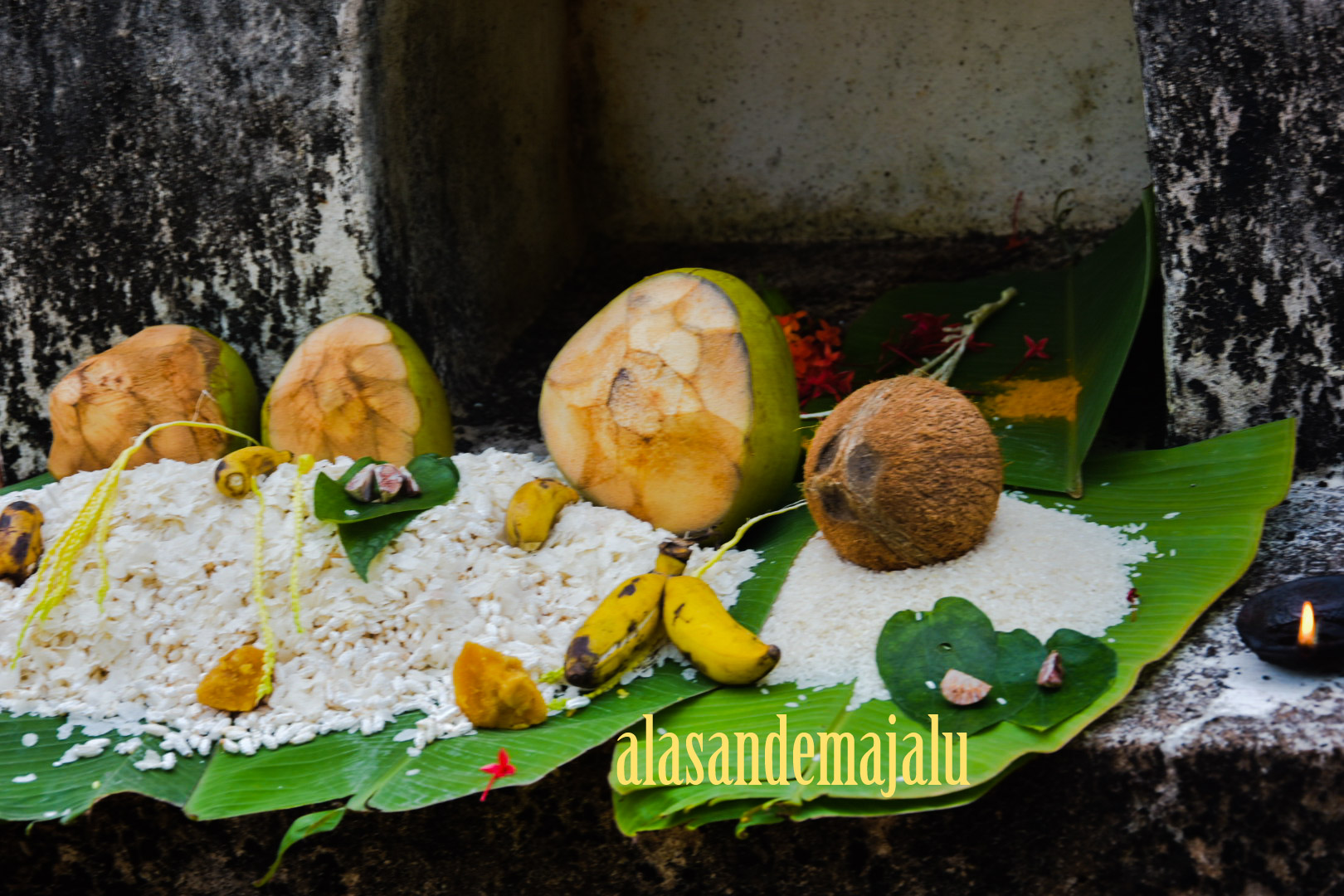
Pattanaje

As per the Tulu culture, annual chariot festivals, Nemotsava, folk ritual dances, Kambala, Yakshagana and various other rituals are across Tulunadu resume in ‘Jarde’ month of the Tulu calendar and conclude in Pattanaje. Pattanaje is setting a deadline for celebration in Tulunadu. Pattanaje Rule is practiced in Dakshina Kannada, Udupi and Kasaragod and parts of Madikeri districts of state Karnataka. The annual festivals, special Parvas and festivals held in the Divine Temples are concluded on this day. The next three months is a break and there will be no Korikatta (Cock Fight), Boothakola, Car festivals, No special festivals are held in Tulunadu temples but only regular worship and everlasting sacrifice are held as usual.

There are more than thirty folktales in Tulunadu. Some of them are run by different castes. These looms continue to run differently from Ati to Patanaje. Ati kalanja, Sonada jogi, sonada madimal, kaveri puruse, madira, mayita purse, mankali, marve, kanyapu, polsondi popini, moorle nalike, Siddavesa, karaga nalike, kandakori nalike, Keddaso leppu, etc. Out of there the role of women participation is includes Madira, Sona Madimamal, Polsodi Pope, Moorle Nalike etc.

== Custom ==
On the day of Pattanaje, Guliga, Bairava, and all other place of worship of a deity, Shrine of Bhuta, Serving rice and other edibles on a plantain leaf for appeasing special spirits. Most rituals of pattanaje are held outside of house mostly in daivasthana, guligana katte, bairavaa katte or just in front of spirit stone.

== Mugera Ritual ==
On this day they offer tambila to the family deities. All the family gathered at their home. Married ladies must attend the event. They should bring one young hen which has not yet laid eggs and one kilo rice, spices and pepper should be brought. The eldest person called Kapada doing all the rituals and prayed to kutumba daiva that the daughters should not get into trouble.

== Gejje Bicchapuna ==
All yakshagana mela around Tulunadu region take off their costume and keep safe aside for next term it will begin on Parbo (Deepavali Generally) it is called Gejje Bicchapuna.
