= Public holidays in Tamil Nadu =

State government issued holidays in Tamil Nadu, India

The Indian state of Tamil Nadu has 23 public holidays for staff working in government offices and banks. They are declared under the Negotiable Instruments Act of 1881. Three of them are national holidays: Republic Day, Independence Day and Gandhi Jayanthi. State-specific holidays include Pongal, Thiruvalluvar Day, and Tamil New Year.

== Table ==
Holiday	2021
New Years Day	1 January
Pongal	15 January
Thiruvalluvar Day	16 January
Uzhavar Thirunal	17 January
Republic Day	26 January
Telugu New Years Day	23 March
Annual closing of accounts for commercial & co-operative banks	1 April
Mahaveer Jayanthi	6 April
Good Friday	10 April
Tamil New Year Day, B R Ambedkar’s birthday	14 April
May Day (Labour's day)	1 May
Ramzan	5 May
Bakrid	1 August
Krishna Jayanthi	11 August
Independence day	15 August
Ganesh Chaturthi	22 August
Muharram	30 August
Gandhi Jayanthi (Mahatma Gandhi's birthday)	2 October
Ayutha Pooja	14 October
Vijayadasami	15 October
Milad-un-Nabi	30 October
Deepavali (Diwali)	14 November
Christmas	25 December

== Other days of importance ==
These are major festivals or observances that are not declared a holiday by government.

- Aadi Perukku
- Karthikai Deepam
- Mahamaham
- Thaipusam
