= Puthandu =

First day of the Tamil calendar

Puthandu Tamil Hindu New Year
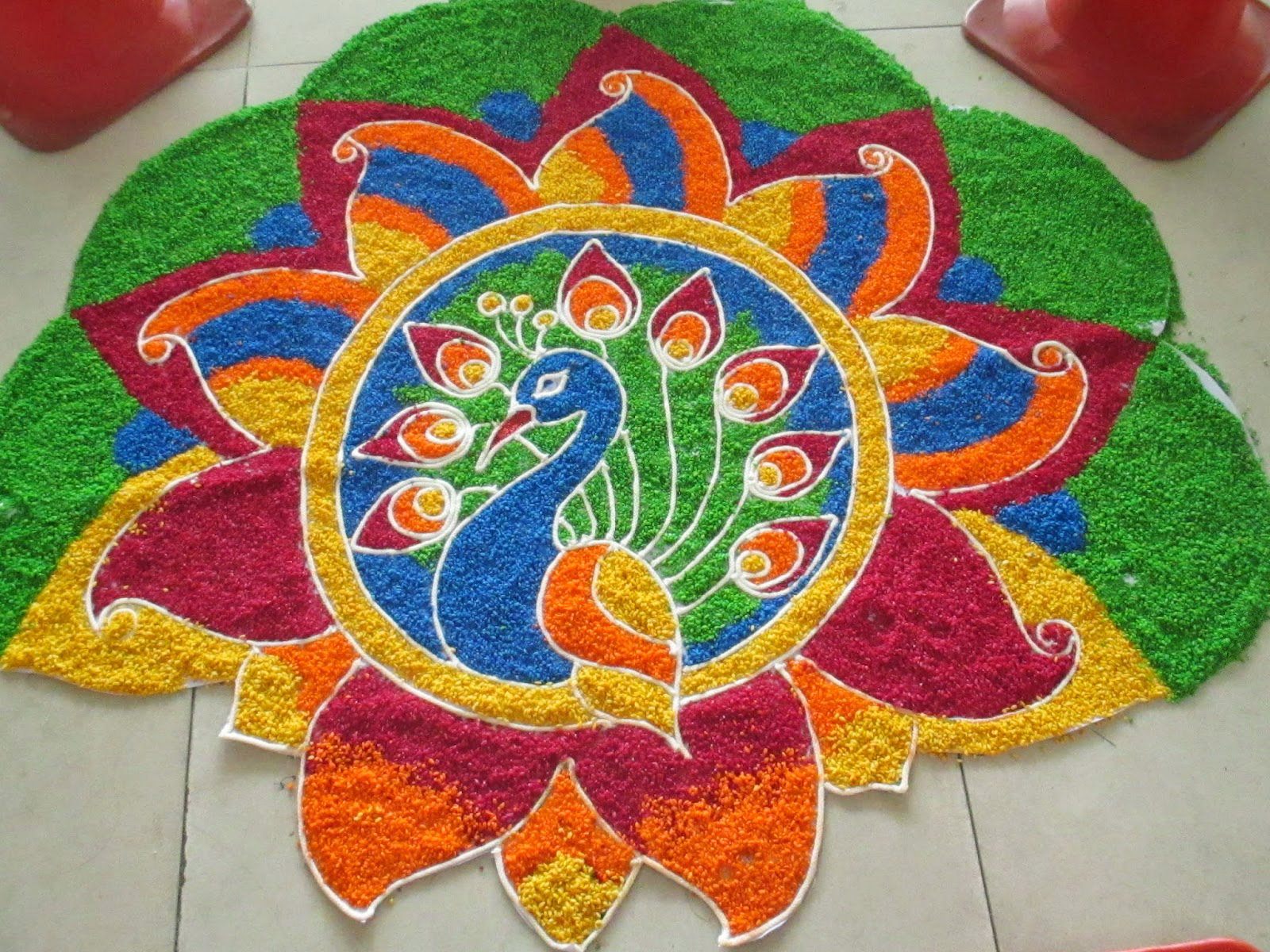
- Tamil New Year decorations for Puthandu
- Official name: Puthandu
- Also called: Varasa Pirapu
- Observed by: Tamils in India, Sri Lanka, Mauritius, Reunion, Malaysia, Singapore, South Africa
- Type: Cultural, Social, Religious
- Significance: Tamil New Year
- Celebrations: Feasting, gift-giving, visiting homes and temples, Kani tray
- Date: First day of Chithirai in the Tamil calendar
- 2026 date: 14 April
- Frequency: Annual
- Related to: South and Southeast Asian solar New Year, Vishu, Sinhalese New Year

Puthandu (Tamil: புத்தாண்டு, romanized: Puttāṇṭu, lit. 'new year'), also known as Tamil New Year (Tamil: வருடப்பிறப்பு, romanized: Varusappiṟappu, lit. 'birth of year'), is the first day of year on the Tamil calendar that is traditionally celebrated as a festival by Tamils. The festival date is set with the solar cycle of the solar Hindu calendar, as the first day of the month of Chittirai. It falls on or about 14 April every year on the Gregorian calendar. The same day is observed elsewhere in South and South East Asia as the traditional new year, but it is known by other names such as Vishu in Kerala, Bisu Parba in Tulunadu, and Vaisakhi or Baisakhi in central and northern India.

On this day, Tamil people greet each other by saying "Puttāṇṭu vāḻttukaḷ!" (புத்தாண்டு வாழ்த்துகள்) or "Iṉiya puttāṇṭu nalvāḻttukaḷ!" (இனிய புத்தாண்டு நல்வாழ்த்துகள்), which is equivalent to "Happy new year". The day is observed as a family time. Households clean up the house, prepare a tray with fruits, flowers and auspicious items, light up the family puja altar and visit their local temples. People wear new clothes and children go to elders to pay their respects and seek their blessings, then the family sits down to a vegetarian feast.

Puthandu is celebrated by Tamils in Tamil Nadu and Puducherry, and in Sri Lanka, Malaysia, Singapore, Mauritius and Reunion. The Tamil diaspora also celebrates it in countries such as Myanmar, South Africa, United Kingdom, United States, Canada, and Australia.

== Origin and significance ==
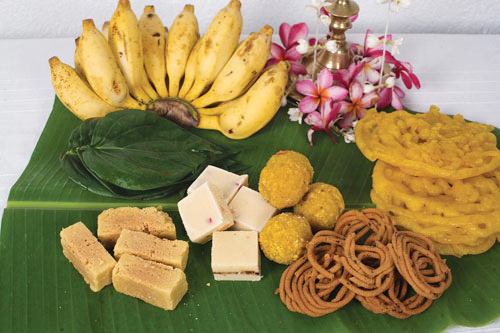
A traditional arrangement of festive foods for Puthandu.

The Tamil New Year follows the spring equinox and generally falls on 14 April of the Gregorian year. The day celebrates on the first day of the traditional Tamil calendar and is a public holiday in both Tamil Nadu and Sri Lanka. The same date is observed as the traditional new year in Assam, West Bengal, Kerala, Tripura, Bihar, Odisha, Punjab, Himachal Pradesh, Haryana, as well as in Nepal and Bangladesh. Myanmar, Cambodia, Laos, Thailand, and Sri Lanka also celebrate the same day as their new year, likely an influence of the shared culture between South and Southeast Asia in the 1st millennium CE.

There are several references in early Tamil literature to the April new year. Nakkirar, Sangam period author of the Neṭunalvāṭai, wrote that the sun travels from Mesha/Chittirai through 11 successive signs of the zodiac. Kūdalūr Kiḻār refers to Mesha Raasi/Chittirai as the commencement of the year in the Puṟanāṉūṟu. The Tolkaapiyam is the oldest surviving Tamil grammar that divides the year into six seasons where Chittirai marks the start of the Ilavenil season or summer. The Silappadikaaram mentions the 12 Raasis or zodiac signs starting with Mesha/Chittirai. The Manimekalai alludes to the Hindu solar calendar as we know it today. Adiyarkunalaar, an early medieval commentator or Urai-asiriyar mentions the twelve months of the Tamil calendar with particular reference to Chittirai. There were subsequent inscriptional references in Pagan, Burma dated to the 11th century CE and in Sukhothai, Thailand dated to the 14th century CE to South Indian, often Vaishnavite, courtiers who were tasked with defining the traditional calendar that began in mid-April.

== Celebration ==
Tamil people celebrate Puthandu, also called Puthuvarusham, as the traditional "Tamil/New Year", states Peter Reeves. This is the month of Chittirai, the first month of the Tamil solar calendar, and Puthandu typically falls on 14 April. In some parts of Southern Tamil Nadu, the festival is called Chittirai Vishu. On the eve of Puthandu, a tray is arranged with three fruits (mango, banana and jack fruit), betel leaves and arecanut, gold/silver jewellery, coins/money, flowers and a mirror. This is similar to the Vishu new year festival ceremonial tray in Kerala. According to the Tamil tradition, this festive tray is auspicious as the first sight upon waking on the new year day. Home entrances are decorated elaborately with colored rice powder. These designs are called kolams.

=== Chittirai Thiruvizha in temples ===
In the temple city of Madurai, the Chithirai Thiruvizha is celebrated in the Meenakshi Temple. A huge exhibition is held, called Chittirai Porutkaatchi. On the day of the Tamil New Year, a big Car Festival is held at Tiruvidaimarudur near Kumbakonam. Festivals are also held at Tiruchirapalli, Kanchipuram and other places.

=== Chithiraikani in Kongu Nadu ===
Chithiraikani, also known as Vishukani, is an important part of the Puthandu celebrations in the Kongu Nadu region, which share similarities with Vishu celebrations in Kerala and Tulu Nadu.

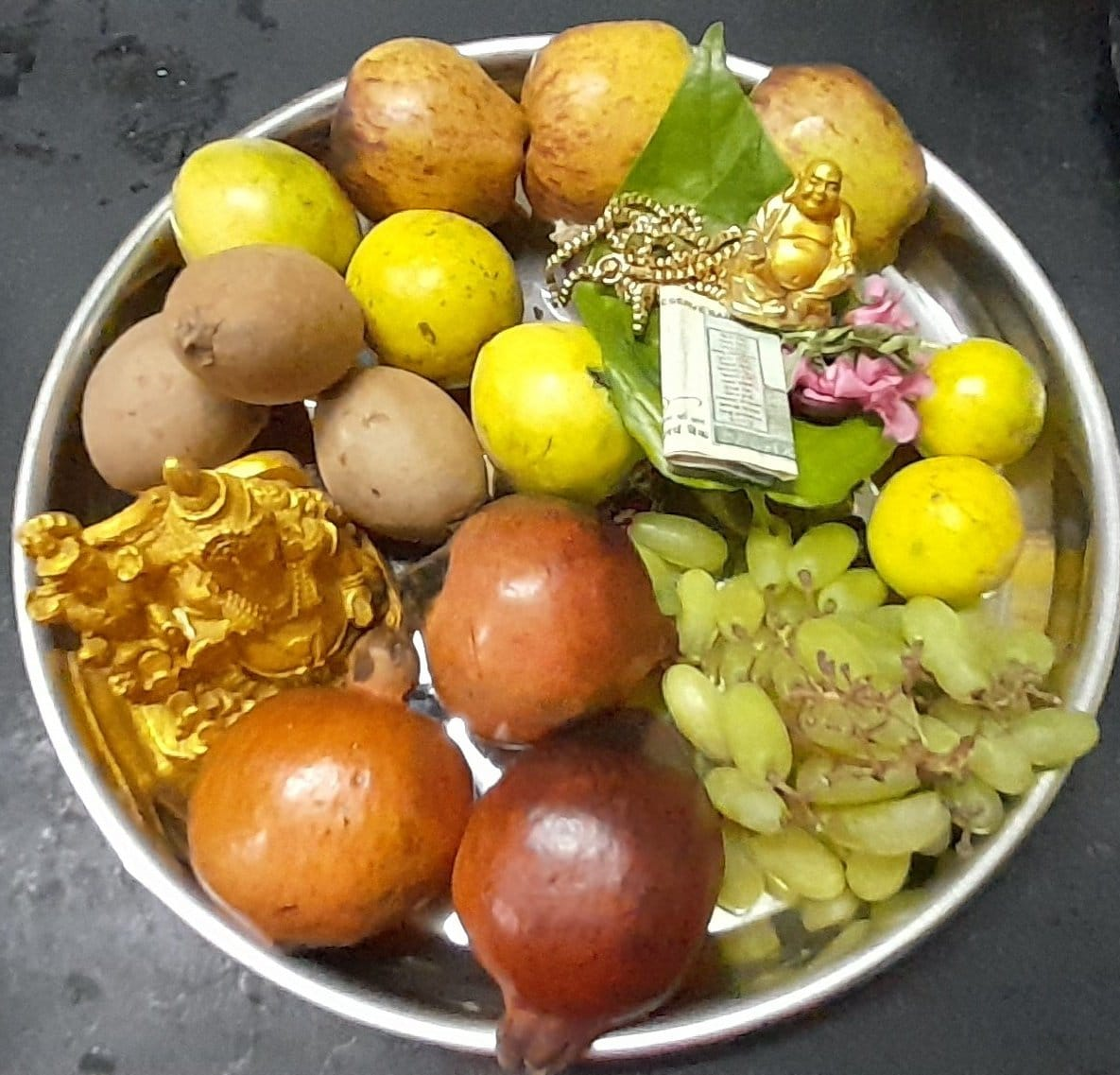
An Kongu Naadu culture of Chithirai Kani plate with arrangement of auspicious fruits, betel leaves, rice, gold or silver jewelry, coins, money, flowers displayed in front of a mirror, symbolizing wealth.

This Chithiraikani practice involves arrangement of a special tray containing auspicious items that are displayed in front of a mirror. The word "kani" in Kongu Tamil and Malayalam means "that which is seen first," and both celebrations involve arranging a special tray of auspicious items that are displayed in front of a mirror. The traditional belief is that viewing joyful and auspicious things first on the new year day brings prosperity and good luck.

The Chithiraikani or Vishukani tray typically includes three fruits (mango, banana, and jackfruit), betel leaves, rice, lemon, cucumber, coconut cut open, arecanut, gold or silver jewelry, coins or money, flowers, and a mirror, among other things that symbolize wealth and prosperity. This arrangement is similar to the Vishu celebrations that take place in Kerala. In some parts of Kerala, the Vishukkani tray also includes Aranmula kannadi (Vaalkannadi), golden color Konna flowers (Cassia fistula) which bloom in the season of Vishu, gold or silver jewelry, coins or money, flowers, and a mirror. The mirror symbolizes seeing oneself as a part of the abundance one sees in the form of Pani.

The day before the Chithiraikani or Vishukkani celebrations, people prepare the tray of auspicious items. On the new year day, elders light lamps and wake up juniors in the family. As soon as they wake up, they walk to the kani with their eyes closed and see it as the first scene of the year. This tradition is significant in both regions and is believed to bring good luck and prosperity for the coming year.

=== Sri Lanka ===
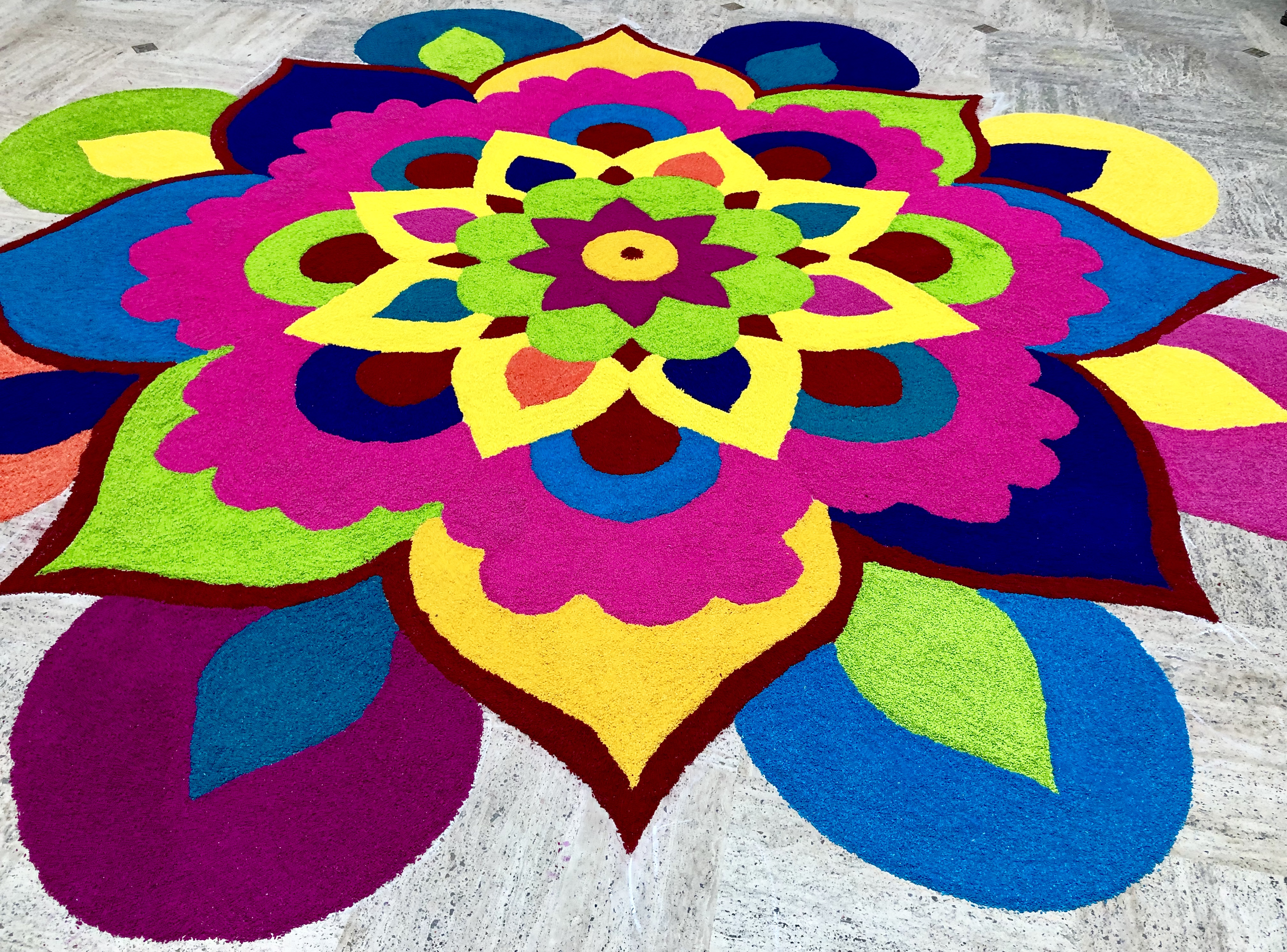
Tamil people decorate their homes with various auspicious colorful geometric designs from rice powder called Kolam.

Sri Lankan Tamils observe the traditional new year in April with the first financial transaction known as the Kai-vishesham. In this transaction children go to elders to pay their respect, and elders give their blessings and gift pocket money to the children in return. The event is also observed with the 'arpudu' or the first ploughing of the ground to prepare for the new agricultural cycle. The game of 'por-thenkai' or coconut wars between youth is played in villages through the Tamil north and east of the island while cart races are also held. The festive Puthandu season in April is a time for family reunion and the renewal of filial bonds. It coincides with the Sinhalese new year season.

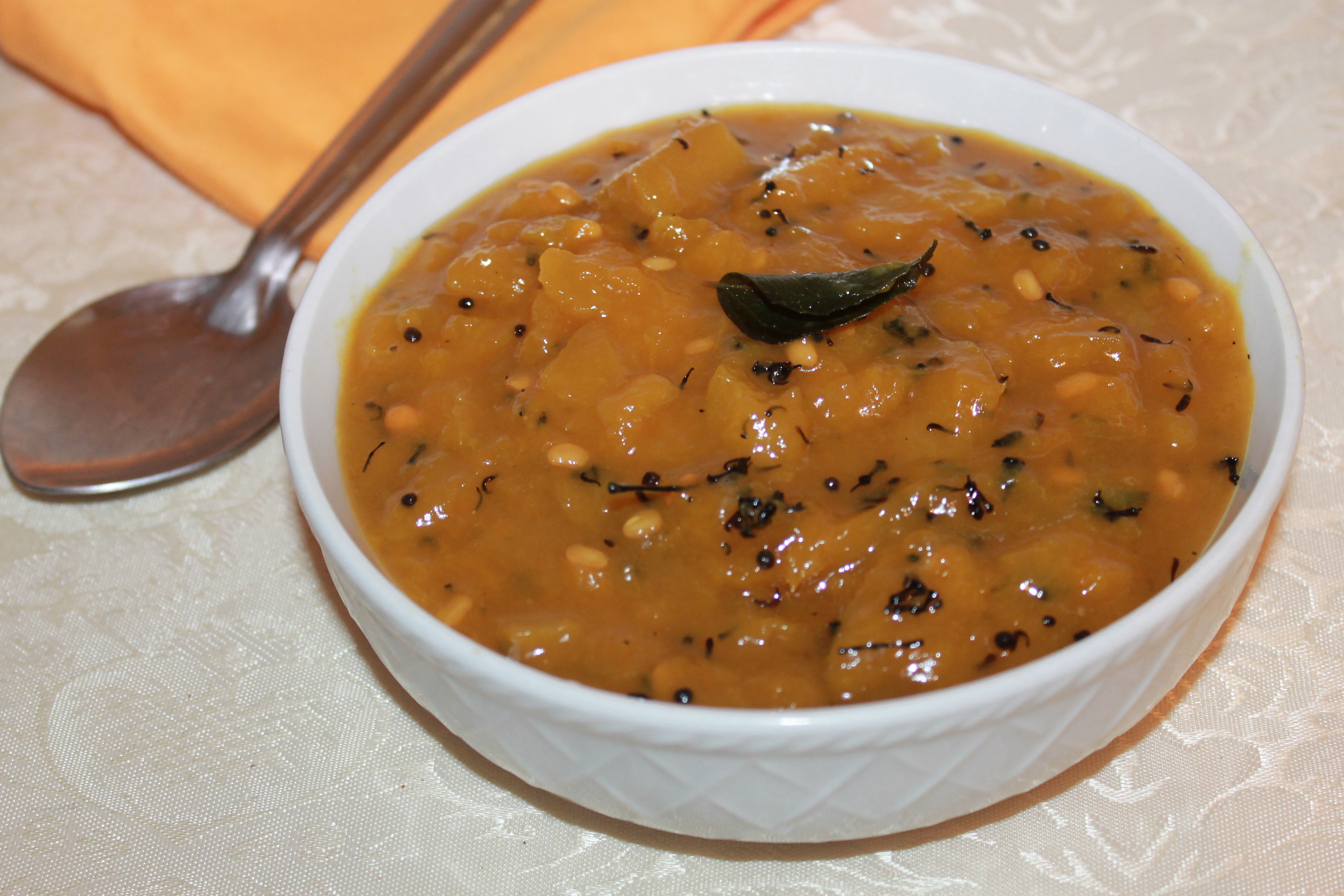
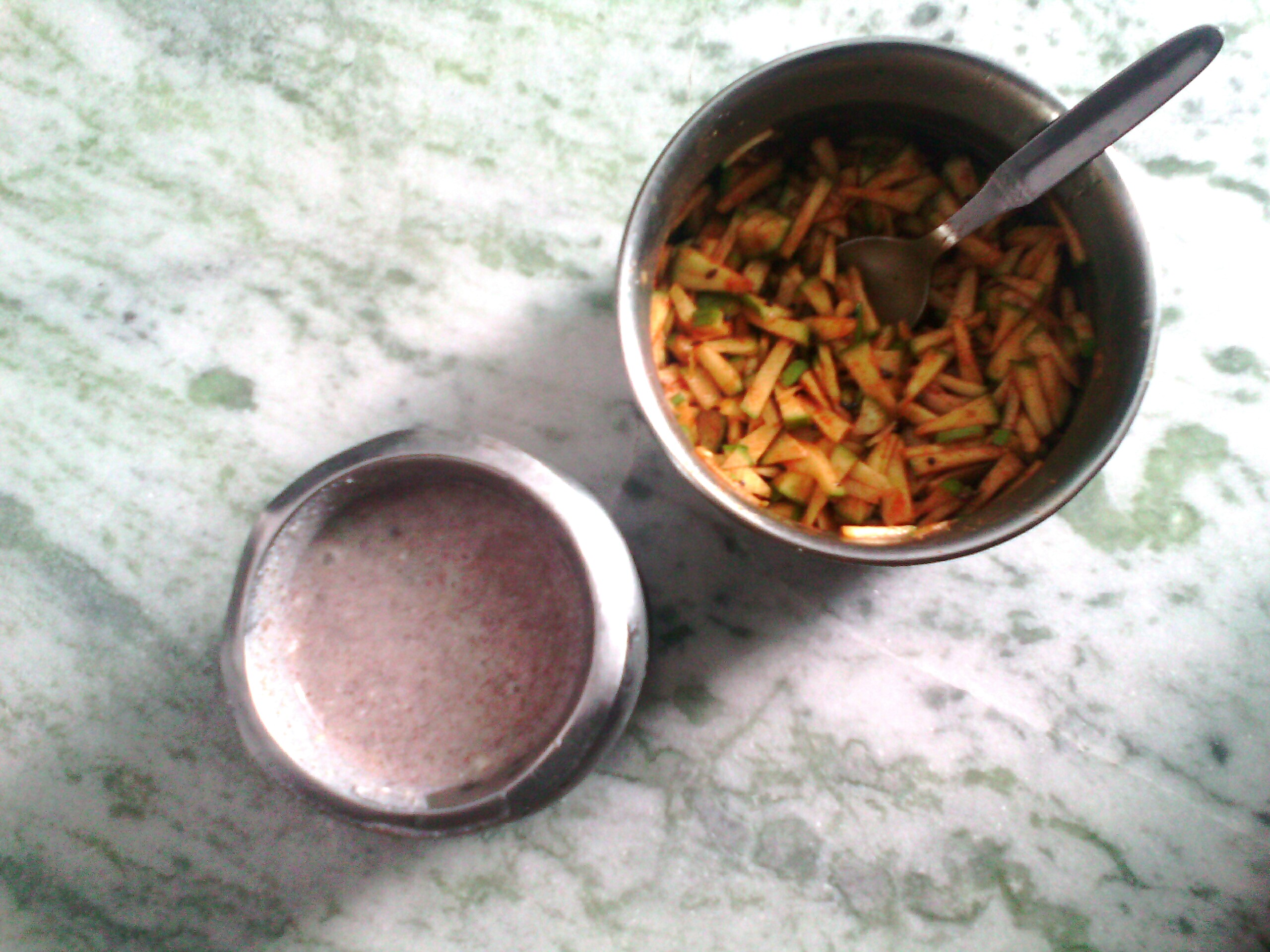
Two styles of mango-based pachadi dish, that combines many bitter-sour-sweet-pungent flavors to mark Puthandu.

Later in the day, families enjoy a feast.

=== Overseas ===
In Malaysia and Singapore, Tamils join Sikhs, Malayalees and Bengalis to celebrate the traditional new year in mid-April with leaders across the political spectrum wishing the ethnic Indian community for the new year. Special religious events are held in Hindu temples, in Tamil community centers and Gurdwaras. Cultural programs and media events also take place. It's a day of celebration for the Indian community.

== Controversy ==
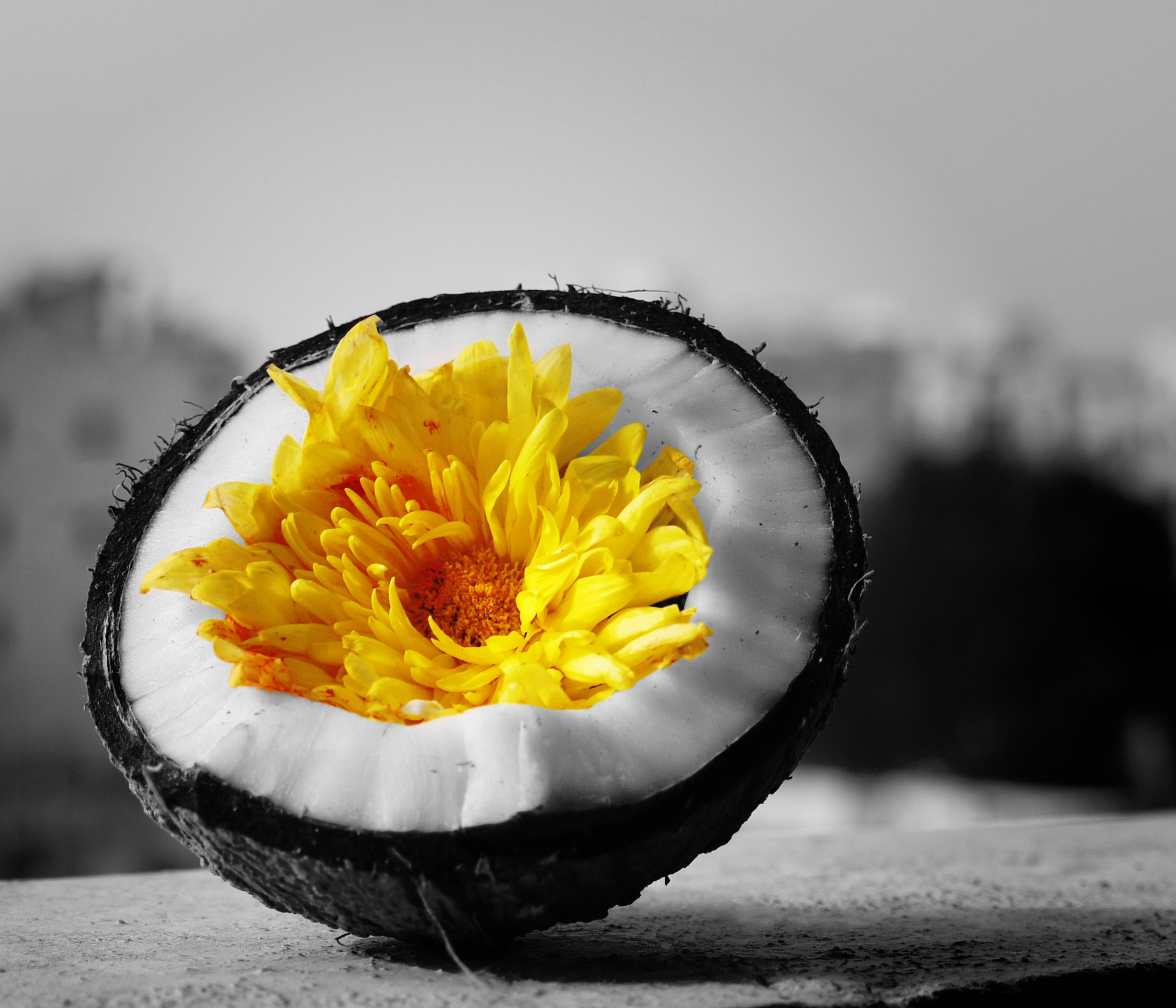
A Puthandu decoration at a Hindu temple

The Dravida Munnetra Kazhagam (DMK)-led Government of Tamil Nadu had declared in 2008 that the Tamil new year should be celebrated on the first day of Tamil month of Thai (14 January) coinciding with the harvest festival of Pongal. The Tamil Nadu New Year (Declaration Bill 2008) was enacted as the state law by the DMK assembly members and its Tamil Nadu Government on 29 January 2008. This law of the DMK majority-led government was subsequently rescinded by a separate act of legislation in the Tamil Nadu Assembly with an AIADMK majority-led government on 23 August 2011. Many in Tamil Nadu ignored the DMK government legislation that rescheduled the festival date, and continued the celebration of their traditional Puthandu new year festival in mid-April. The Governor and Chief Minister of the Indian Union Territory of Puducherry, which has an ethnic Tamil majority, felicitated the public for the Tamil new year in April 2010.

The legislative reach to change the traditional religious new year by the DMK government was questioned by Hindu priests and Tamil scholars. The law was met with resistance by Tamils in the state and elsewhere. It was also challenged in court. The then opposition All India Anna Dravida Munnetra Kazhagam (AIADMK) and Marumalarchi Dravida Munnetra Kazhagam (MDMK) in Tamil Nadu subsequently condemned the decision of the DMK Government in that state and urged their supporters to continue celebrating the traditional date in mid-April. Tamils in Sri Lanka, Singapore, Malaysia and Canada continued to observe the new year in mid-April.

The previous state government in Tamil Nadu in an effort to placate popular sentiment announced that the same day will be celebrated as a new festival renamed as "Chittirai Tirunal" (the festival of Chittirai). The day remained a public holiday in Tamil Nadu under the DMK government, but not as Tamil new year, but purportedly to commemorate Dr. B.R Ambedkar, who was the Chairman of the Drafting Committee of Indian Constitution. All television channels in Tamil Nadu, including the pro-DMK Sun TV, continued to telecast festive "Chittirai Tirunal Special Programs" on 14 April 2010. The leader of the AIADMK, Jayalalitha refused to recognize the repackaged festival, and felicitated the Tamil people for the traditional Tamil New Year. The MDMK leader Vaiko, followed suit. The controversy between the two dates subsided, the official celebrations during the traditional new year in April revived and the public holiday was restored as the Tamil New Year.

== Related festivals ==
Puthandu is celebrated elsewhere in India under different names commemorating the solar new year. Some examples include:

1. Vishu in Kerala
2. Bisu Parba in Tulunadu,
3. Vaisakhi in Punjab, Haryana, Himachal Pradesh, NCT of Delhi, Uttar Pradesh, Uttarakhand, Rajasthan, Bihar, Jharkhand, Madhya Pradesh and Chhattisgarh
4. Pana Sankranti in Odisha
5. Pohela Boishakh in West Bengal and Tripura
6. Rongali Bihu in Assam

However, this is not the universal new year for all Hindus. Lunar New Year celebrations in Karnataka, Andhra Pradesh and Telangana's Ugadi & Maharashtra and Goa's Gudi Padwa, fall a few days before Puthandu. For those in Gujarat, the new year festivities coincide with the five-day Diwali festival.

=== South Asia and Southeast Asia ===
The same day every year is the new year for many Buddhist communities in parts of Southeast Asia such as Myanmar, Sri Lanka and Cambodia, likely an influence of their shared Indic culture in the 1st millennium CE.

According to a 1957 publication by Gunasegaram, the new year celebrated in Sri Lanka, Cambodia and Champa (Vietnam) is the Tamil New Year with roots in the practices of Mohenjo-daro (Indus Valley civilization). According to Nanacuriyan, this may be from the medieval era Tamil influence in Southeast Asia.

According to Jean Michaud and other scholars, the new year celebration traditions in Southeast Asian Massif have two roots. One is China, and this influence is found for example in Vietnam. This Sino-influenced community celebrates the new year in the first or second lunar month after the winter solstice in December. The second group of people in the Massif celebrate the new year in mid April, much like most of India. This group consists of northeastern Indians, northeastern Myanmar, the Khmer in Cambodia, Tai speakers of Thailand, Laos, northern Vietnam and southern Yunnan. The festival is celebrated in the Massif in some ways unlike Puthandu. It is marked by an occasion to visit family and friends, splashing others with water (like Holi), drinking alcohol, as well as later wearing jewelry, new clothes and socializing. The new year festival is called regionally by different names:

1. Vaisakhi in Pakistan and Afghanistan
2. Bikram Samwat / Vaishak Ek in Nepal
3. Pohela Boishakh in Bangladesh
4. Aluth Avuruthu (Sinhalese New Year) in Sri Lanka
5. Chol Chnam Thmey in Cambodia
6. Songkan / Pi Mai Lao in Laos
7. Songkran in Thailand
8. Thingyan in Myanmar

== See also ==
- Tamil culture
