= Keddaso =

Indian religious festival

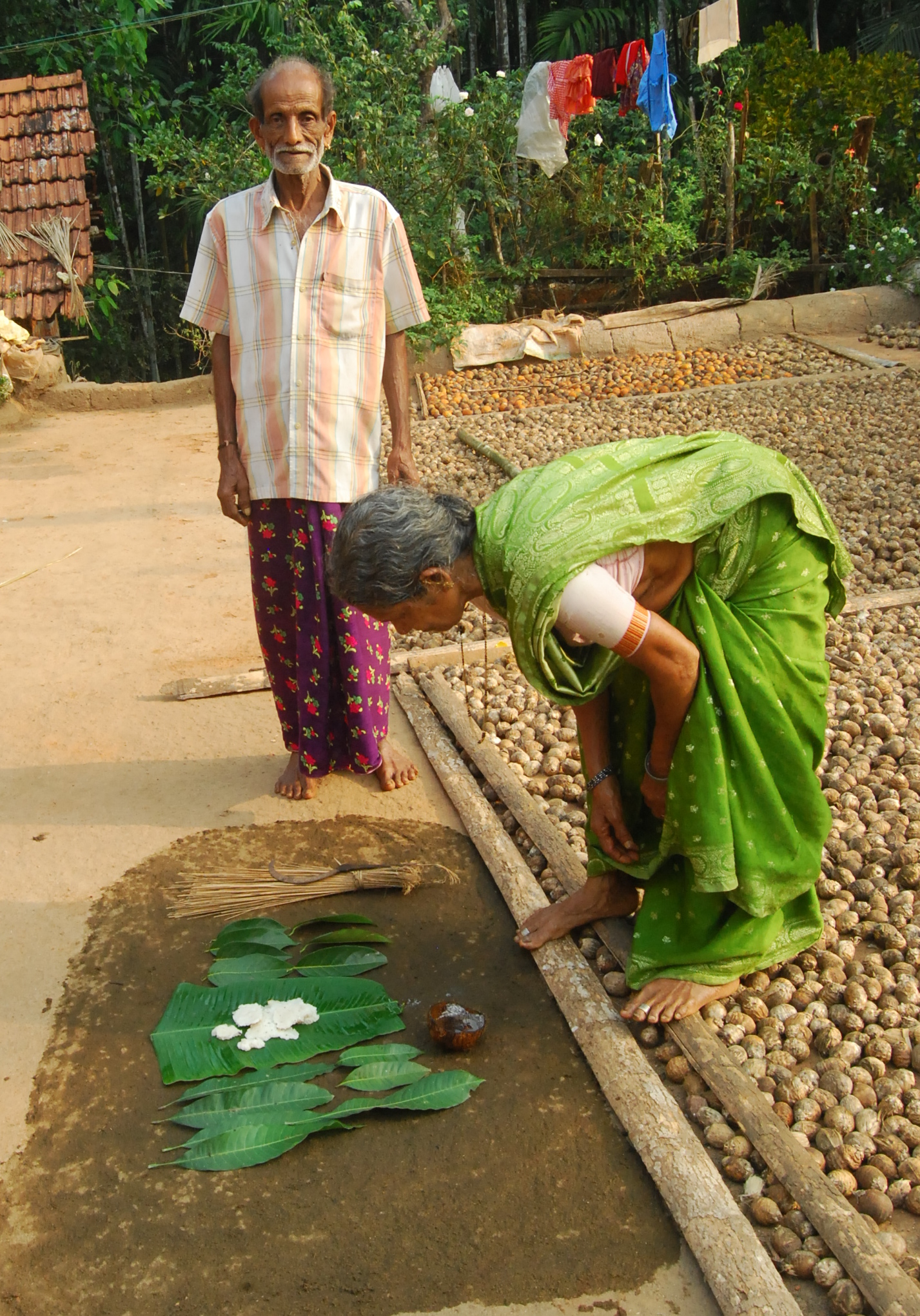
Keddaso – Festival of worshipping Mother Earth

Keddaso also spelled Keddasa (Tulu: keḍḍasa), or Bhumi Puje, is popularly known as the "festival of worshipping Mother Earth" in the Tulu Nadu region of South India. Mother Earth (Bhoomi Devi) gets menstruate and the day is celebrated holistically in Tulunad in the name of ‘Keddasa’. This is an important four-day fertility worship celebrated in the closing days of Tulu month Ponny (Gregorian month February). This festival shows the environmental awareness of the people residing at that region.

== Rituals ==
Keddasa normally falls in the month of February and is celebrated over three days named Keddasa, Nadu Keddasa and Kade Keddasa. This celebrated in the winter of this region, where its believed that Bhoomi Devi gets menstruated and becomes fertile for farming. For three days, the Goddess undergoes Ashaucha and takes rest. People in the region do not perform any farming activity to give the Mother, who is also same as mother Earth, rest According to popular belief as women menstruate, which is a sign of fertility, so also Mother Earth menstruates. So all three days of the festival are considered to be the menstruating period of Mother Earth. During the festival all agricultural operations remain suspended. As in Hindu homes menstruating women remain secluded and do not even touch anything and are given full rest, so also the Mother Earth is given full rest for three days for which all agricultural operations are stopped. During Kade Keddasa an elderly lady of the family performs the ritual, where she makes Sarnadde; unique dish of Tulunad and plates it in front of Tulasi katte. Early morning she wakes up and puts cow dung (ambi) around Tulsi katte and lights lamp. Along with it she keeps Kumkum, Shikakai in front of the katte. She pours coconut oil to the soil as a symbol that she is putting oil to mother earth, before she goes to bathe herself.

Shikai is kept based on the belief that mother earth bathes herself with Shikakai. After bath she comes back; puts Kumkum and haves Sarnadde that has been kept in a banana leaf.

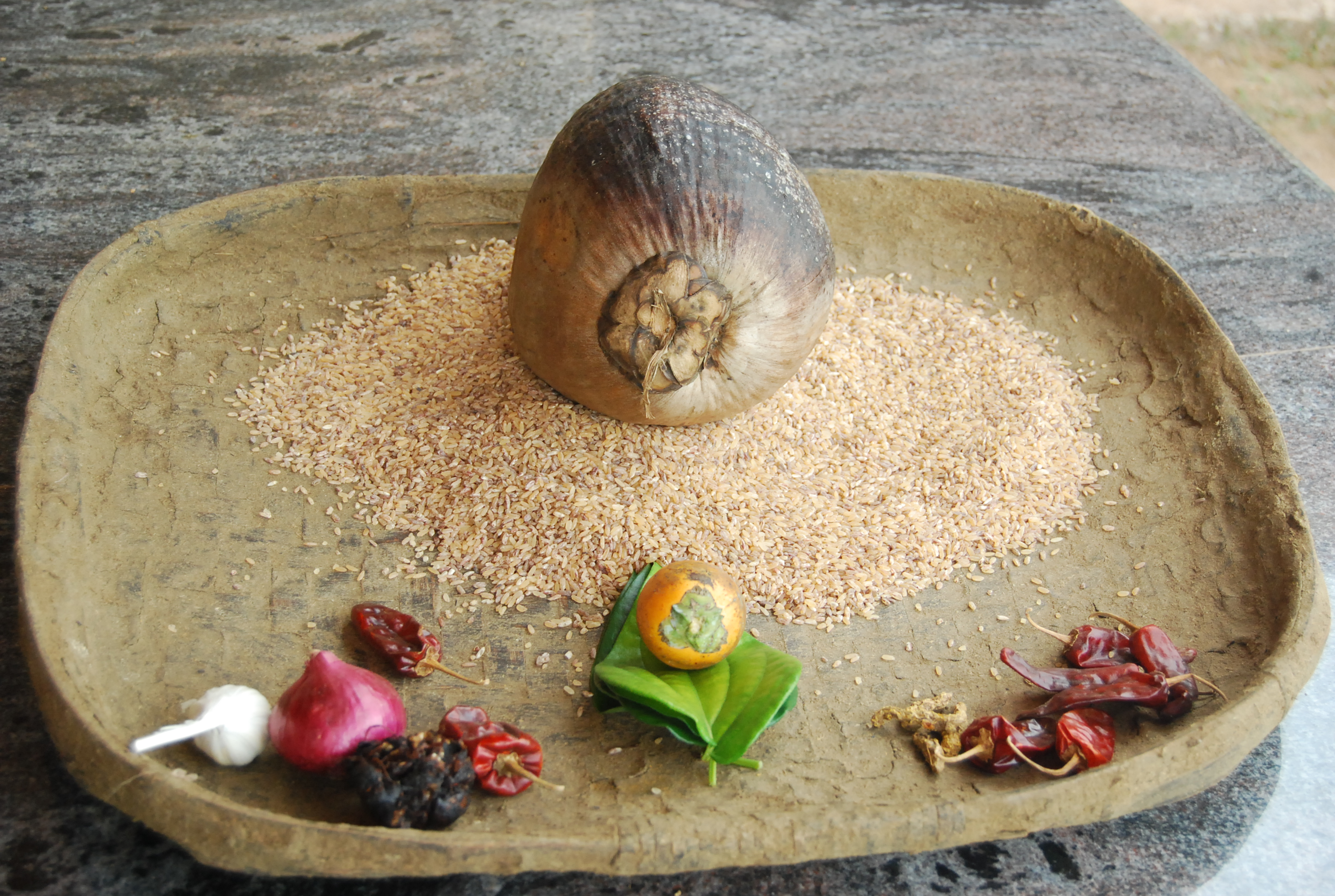
Keddaso Rituals

== Special food ==
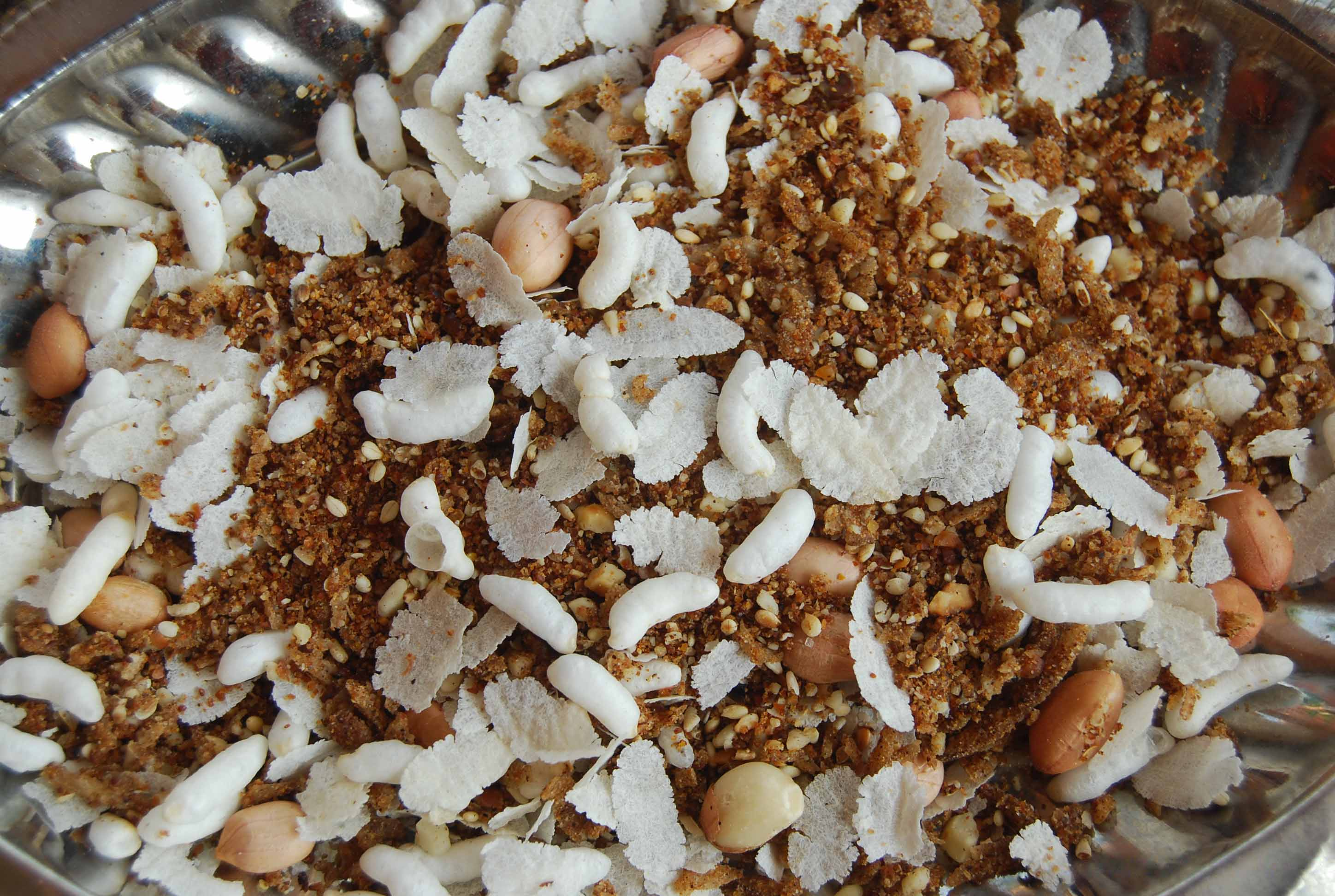
Kudu Ari (Nanyeri)

During Keddasa, one more practice was prevalent was to have lentils like horse gram, green gram, dried coconut, rice and peanuts called as Kudu Ari. They were roasted and were given to all. This is because winter is the time when body needs lot of proteins and oil. These lentils would help the body be intact in working condition.

== Hunting ==
The Arasu of the village went for Bonte (hunting) along with villagers. This in a way was to get rid of the animals that trouble the agricultural works and also for entertainment. To get a break from farming, Tuluvas made a practice of hunting during Keddasa.

== Keddasa chanting ==
Nalike community, who traditionally perform Bhoota kola, visits and invites each and every house members as per their ajalu villages and calls for Keddasa Bonte (hunting). The eldest lady of family offers a big coconut, good quantity of rice, arecanut, betel leaves, chilly, garlic, onion, tamarind and other ingredients which are used for making the curry of the hunted prey. The calling Paddana is like this,

Sōmavāra keḍḍasa,
muṭṭune aṅgāra naḍu keḍḍasa
budhavāra biripune
paji kaḍpare balli
unuṅgel polipyare balli,
arasule bōnṭeṅg
sarver ullāyanakulu pōvōḍuge.
Valasāri majalḍ kūḍdu
valasari dērdd pālejjār jappunaga
uḷḷāldinakulu kaḍipi kan̄jin nīrḍ pāḍōdu.
Ōḍuḍ kaḍevoḍu, kall ḍ roṭṭi pattavoḍu.
Malla malla mr̥rgolu jattd barpa
Kaṭṭa ijjāndi beḍi, kadi kaṭṭandina pagari,
kaila kaḍela pattd
ujjergon̄ji erpu ērpād
illa bēttaḍit untondu
murgoleg tāṇṭāvoḍu.
Malla malla murgolen jayipoḍu.
Eṅk ayita kebi, kār, kai,
uppu, mun̄ci, puḷi koroḍu
