= Chitra Pournami (festival) =

Hindu festival in April or May

Chaitra Purnima சித்திர பௌர்ணமி
- Also called: Chitra Pournami
- Observed by: Hindu Tamils, Malayalis,சித்திர பௌர்ணமி
- Type: Hindu
- Significance: Full moon day of the Chaitra month
- Celebrations: Veneration of Chitragupta and Murugan
- Observances: Puja
- Date: Purnima in Chaitra month
- Frequency: Annual

Chaitra Purnima (Sanskrit: चैत्र पुर्णिमा, romanized: Caitra Purṇimā) or Chitra Pournami is a Hindu festival observed on the purnima (full moon) day of the Chaitra month. It is celebrated across various parts of South Asia observed on the full moon day in the month of Chittirai, corresponding in the Gregorian calendar to a day in April or May.

== Legend ==
The tale of Chitra Purnima is centred on Indra, the kings of the devas, and his guru Brihaspati, based on the folklores of Thiruvilaiyadal Puranam. According to legend, Indra and Brihaspati once got into an argument over something Indra said to Brihaspati. Brihaspati gave him instructions to make a pilgrimage to the earth in order to atone for his negative karma.

After accepting, Indra carried out his guru's wish. Indra discovered a shivaling while on the trip under the kadamba tree. Later, he came to understand that it was Shiva who was aiding him in lessening his bad deeds. He soon began presenting lotus flowers to Shiva as an act of adoration. This legend is believed to have occurred at Madurai by adherents. Devotees perform pujas at the Meenakshi Temple in Madurai to worship Shiva.

== Practices ==
In some parts of India, The festival is dedicated to Chitragupta, a Hindu god who is believed to record humans' good and bad deeds for Yama, the Hindu god of death and the underworld. On this day, devotees ask Chitragupta to give them good thoughts and deeds which will benefit all living beings.

On the festival day, many devotees gather around rivers or places where the moon is visible to have dinner with family and friends. It is believed by doing this they can get the blessings of Chandra and feel the happiness and bond with their loved ones. It is also believed by lighting up an deepam to Chandra alleviates negative states of mind. This is especially popular at the river Chitra in the district of Tirunelveli in Tamil Nadu, India.

The observance is called Chitira Pournami in Tamil Nadu and Kerala, especially by followers of Kaumaram and Shaiva Siddhanta. Devotees observe fasting, worship Murugan, and break their fast the next morning. Adherents believe that moonlight dispels the darkness of one's soul. Murugan worship and the festivals of the deity start on this day every year.
