= Tamil language =

Dravidian language

Tamil
- தமிழ், Tamiḻ
- The word Tamil in the Tamil script
- Pronunciation: [t̪amiɻ]
- Native to: India; Sri Lanka; Maldives; Malaysia; Singapore; Mauritius
- Region: India; Tamil Nadu; Union territory of Puducherry (Puducherry and Karaikal districts); Kerala; Karnataka (south); Andhra Pradesh (south); Andaman and Nicobar Islands; Sri Lanka; Northern Province; Eastern Province; Central Province; Maldives; Giraavaru (extinct)
- Ethnicity: Tamils; Sri Lankan Moors
- Speakers: L1: 79 million (2011–2019); L2: 7.6 million (2011); Total: 86 million (2011–2019)
- Language family: Dravidian: Southern; Southern I; Tamil–Kannada; Tamil–Kota; Tamil–Toda; Tamil–Irula; Tamil–Kodava–Urali; Tamil–Malayalam; Tamiloid; Tamil–Paliyan; Tamil
- Early forms: Old Tamil: Middle Tamil
- Dialects: Eelam; Malesiyat; Bunagurr; Iyengar; Kongu; Chennai; Madurai; Tiruneveli; Estate; Central; Brahmin; Arwi; Malabar †
- Writing system: Tamil script; Tamil-Brahmi script (historical); Grantha script (historical); Vatteluttu script (historical); Pallava script (historical); Kolezhuthu script (historical); Arabic script (Arwi); Latin script (informal); Tamil Braille (Bharati)
- Signed forms: Signed Tamil

Official status
- Official language in: India; Tamil Nadu; Puducherry; Sri Lanka; Singapore
- Recognised minority language in: South Africa (Note: protected language); Malaysia
- Regulated by: India: Central Institute of Classical Tamil; Department of Tamil Development and Information (Tamil Nadu); International Institute of Tamil Studies; Tamil University; World Tamil Sangam; Sri Lanka: Department of Official Languages; Singapore: Tamil Language Council; Malaysia: Malaysian Tamil Language Standardisation Council; Canada and United States: Federation of Tamil Sangams of North America

Language codes
- ISO 639-1: ta
- ISO 639-2: tam
- ISO 639-3: tam
- Glottolog: tami1289
- Linguasphere: 49-EBE-a
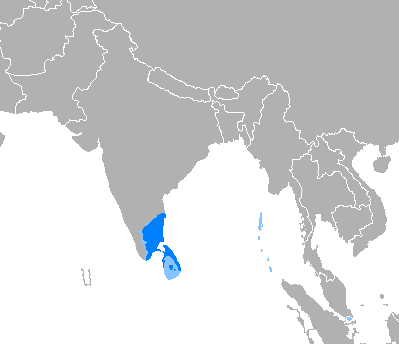

Tamil (Note: /ˈtæmɪl, ˈtɑːm-/ TAM-il, TAHM-.) (தமிழ், Tamiḻ, pronounced [t̪amiɻ]) is a Dravidian language spoken by the Tamil people of South Asia where they are concentrated in Tamil Nadu and Pondicherry in India and the Northern and Eastern Provinces in Sri Lanka. It is one of the longest-surviving classical languages in the world, attested since c. 300 BCE.

Tamil was the lingua franca for early maritime traders in South India, with Tamil inscriptions found outside of the Indian subcontinent, such as Indonesia, Thailand, and Egypt. The language has a well-documented history with literary works like Sangam literature, consisting of over 2,000 poems. Tamil script evolved from Tamil Brahmi, and later, the vatteluttu script was used until the current script was standardized. The language has a distinct grammatical structure, with agglutinative morphology that allows for complex word formations.

Tamil is the official language of the state of Tamil Nadu and union territory of Puducherry in India. It is also one of the official languages of Sri Lanka and Singapore. Tamil-speaking diaspora communities exist in several countries across the world. Tamil was the first to be recognized as a classical language of India by the Central Government in 2004.

== Etymology ==
The earliest extant Tamil literary works and their commentaries celebrate the Pandiyan Kings for the organization of long-term Tamil Sangams, which researched, developed and made amendments to the Tamil language. Although the name of the language which was developed by these Tamil Sangams is mentioned as Tamil, the period when the name "Tamil" came to be applied to the language is unclear, as is the precise etymology of the name. The earliest attested use of the name is found in Tholkappiyam, which is also the oldest extant Tamil text, dated as early as the 2nd century BCE. The Hathigumpha inscription, inscribed around a similar period (150 BCE) by Kharavela, the Jain king of Kalinga, also refers to a Tamira Samghatta (Tamil confederacy).

The Samavayanga Sutra, dated to the 3rd century BCE, contains a reference to a Tamil script named 'Damili'.

Southworth suggests that the name comes from tam-miḻ > tam-iḻ "self-speak", or "our own speech". Kamil Zvelebil suggests an etymology of tam-iḻ, with tam meaning "self" or "one's self", and "-iḻ" having the connotation of "unfolding sound". Alternatively, he suggests a derivation of tamiḻ < tam-iḻ < *tav-iḻ < *tak-iḻ, meaning in origin "the proper process (of speaking)". However, this is deemed unlikely by Southworth due to the contemporary use of the compound 'centamiḻ', which means refined speech in the earliest literature.

The Tamil Lexicon of the University of Madras defines the word "Tamil" as "sweetness". S. V. Subramanian suggests the meaning "sweet sound", from tam – "sweet" and il – "sound".

David Shulman cites Cuntaramurti's Tevaram, in which he writes to Shiva, "Do you know proper Tamil?" and ascribes it the meaning "Do you know how to behave properly as a male lover should? Can you understand the hints and implicit meaning that a proficient lover ought to be able to decipher?" He also states that at some point in history, Tamil meant something like "knowing how to love", in a poetic sense, and that to "know Tamil" could also mean "to be a civilized being".

== Classification ==
Tamil belongs to the southern branch of the Dravidian languages, a family of around 26 languages native to the Indian subcontinent. It is also classified as being part of a Tamil language family that, alongside Tamil proper, includes the languages of about 35 ethno-linguistic groups such as the Irula and Yerukula languages (see SIL Ethnologue).

The closest major relative of Tamil is Malayalam; the two began diverging around the 9th century CE. Although many of the differences between Tamil and Malayalam demonstrate a pre-historic divergence of the western dialect, the process of separation into a distinct language, Malayalam, was not completed until sometime in the 13th or 14th century.

Additionally Kannada is also relatively close to the Tamil language and shares the format of the formal ancient Tamil language. While there are some variations from the Tamil language, Kannada still preserves a lot from its roots. As part of the southern family of Indian languages and situated relatively close to the northern parts of India, Kannada also shares some Sanskrit words, similar to Malayalam. Many of the formerly used words in Tamil have been preserved with little change in Kannada. This shows a relative parallel to Tamil, even as Tamil has undergone some changes in modern ways of speaking.

== History ==
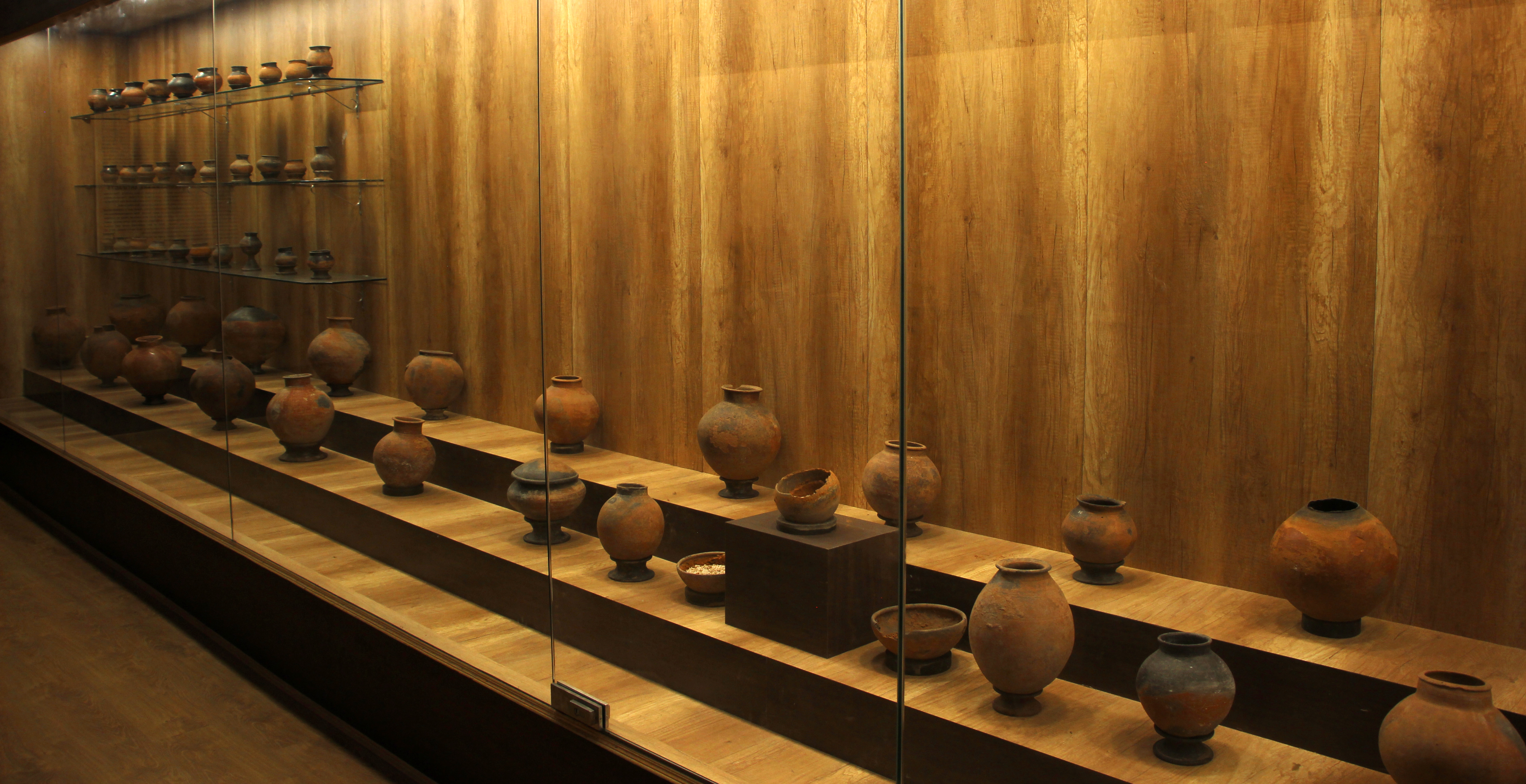
Findings from Adichanallur in the Government Museum, Chennai

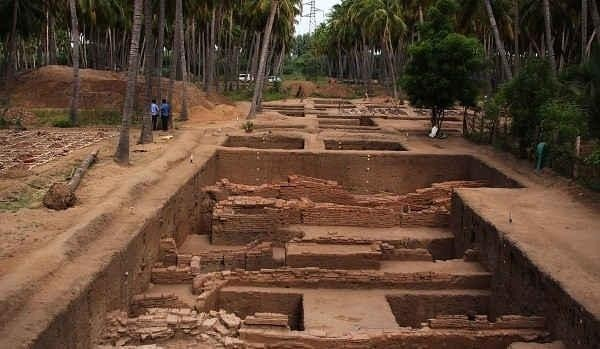
Keezhadi excavation site

=== Legendary origins ===
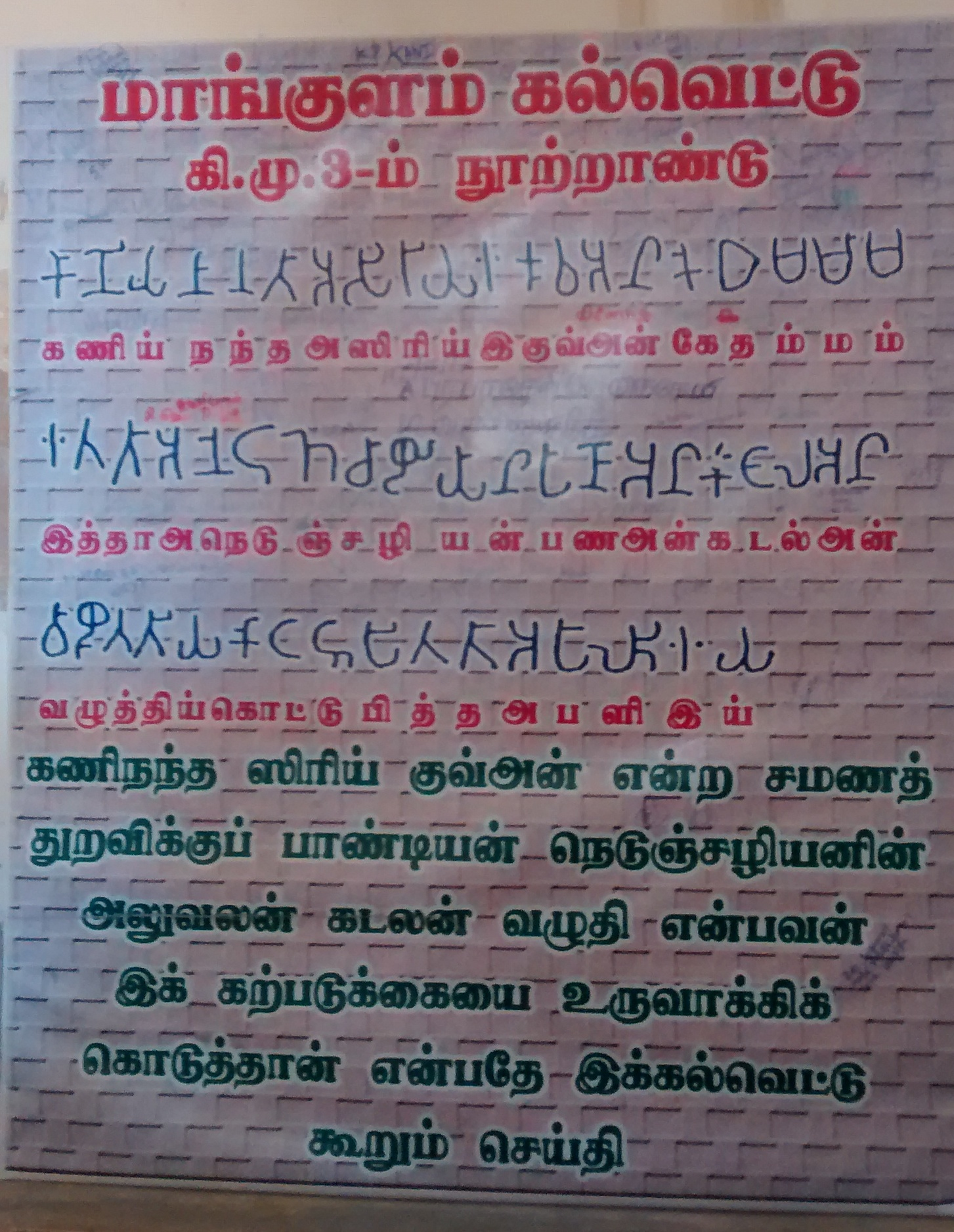
Explanation for Mangulam Tamil Brahmi inscription in Mangulam, Madurai district, Tamil Nadu, dated to Tamil Sangam period (c. 400 BCE – c. 200 CE)

According to Hindu legend, Tamil or in personification form Tamil Thāi (Mother Tamil) was created by Lord Shiva. Murugan, revered as the Tamil God, along with sage Agastya, brought it to the people.

=== Historical origins ===
Tamil, like other Dravidian languages, ultimately descends from the Proto-Dravidian language, which was most likely spoken around the third millennium BCE, possibly in the region around the lower Godavari river basin. The material evidence suggests that the speakers of Proto-Dravidian were of the culture associated with the Neolithic complexes of South India.

Scholars categorise the attested history of the language into three periods: Old Tamil (300 BCE–700 CE), Middle Tamil (700–1600) and Modern Tamil (1600–present).

=== Brahmi script ===
About 60,000 of the approximately 100,000 inscriptions found by the Archaeological Survey of India in India are in Tamil Nadu. Of them, most are in Tamil, with only about 5 percent in other languages such as Telugu, Kannada, Sanskrit and Marathi.

In 2004, a number of skeletons were found buried in earthenware urns dating from at least 696 BCE in Adichanallur. Some of these urns contained writing in Tamil Brahmi script, and some contained skeletons of Tamil origin. Between 2017 and 2018, 5,820 artifacts have been found in Keezhadi. These were sent to Beta Analytic in Miami, Florida, for Accelerator Mass Spectrometry (AMS) dating. One sample containing Tamil-Brahmi inscriptions was claimed to be dated to around 580 BCE.

John Guy states that Tamil was the lingua franca for early maritime traders from India. Tamil language inscriptions written in Brahmi script have been discovered in Sri Lanka and on trade goods in Thailand and Egypt. In November 2007, an excavation at Quseir-al-Qadim (likely the classical-era port town Myos Hormos) revealed Egyptian pottery dating back to first century BCE with ancient Tamil Brahmi inscriptions. There are a number of apparent Tamil loanwords in Biblical Hebrew dating to before 500 BCE, the oldest attestation of the language.

=== Old Tamil ===
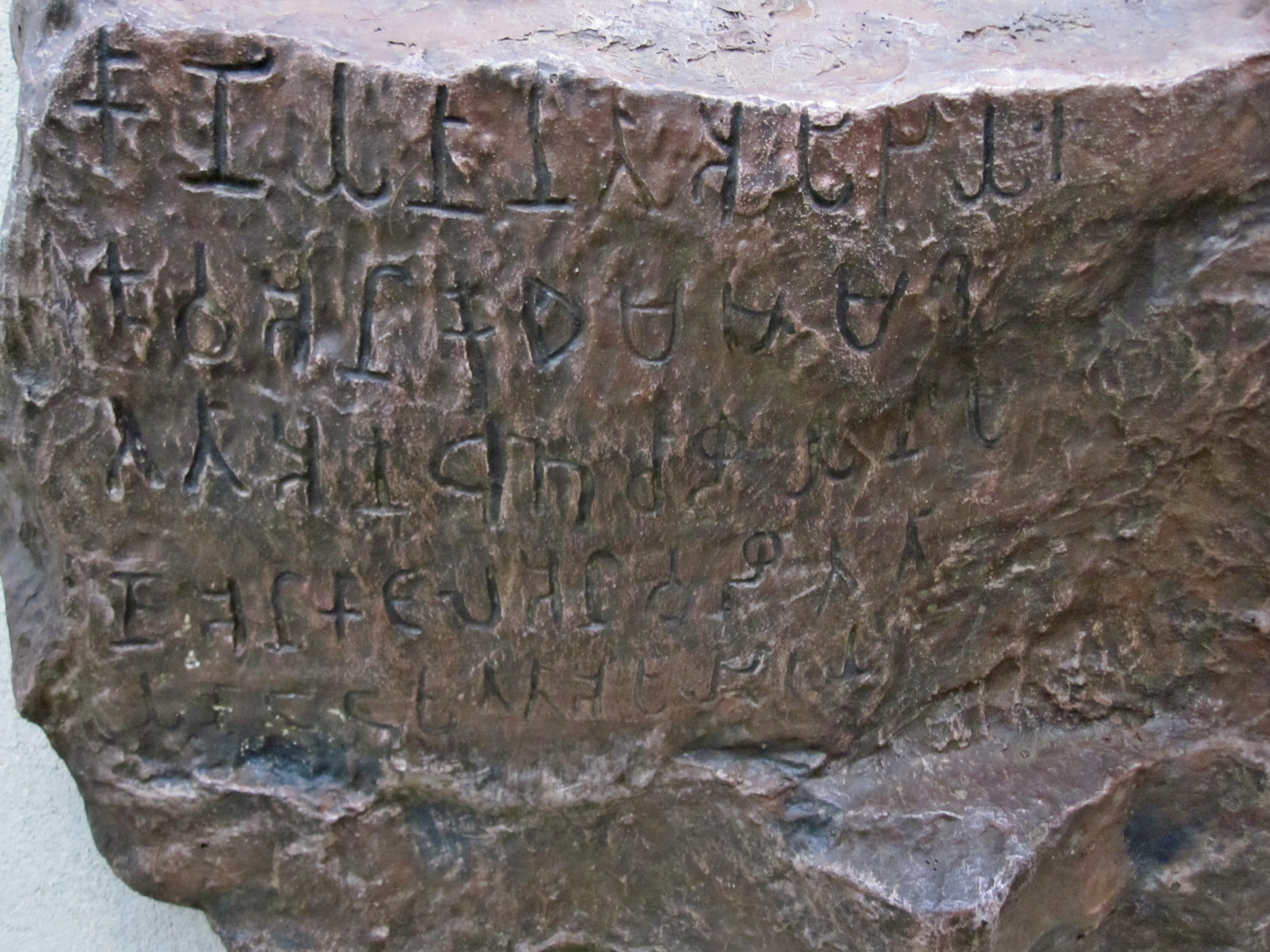
Mangulam Tamil Brahmi inscription in Mangulam, Madurai district, Tamil Nadu, dated to Tamil Sangam period (c. 400 BCE – c. 200 CE)

Old Tamil is the period of the Tamil language spanning the 3rd century BCE to the 8th century CE. The earliest records in Old Tamil are short inscriptions written in a variant of the Brahmi script called Tamil-Brahmi. The earliest long text in Old Tamil is the Tolkāppiyam, an early work on Tamil grammar and poetics, whose oldest layers could be as old as the late 2nd century BCE. Many literary works in Old Tamil have also survived. These include a corpus of 2,381 poems collectively known as Sangam literature. These poems are usually dated to between the 1st century BCE and 5th century CE.

=== Middle Tamil ===
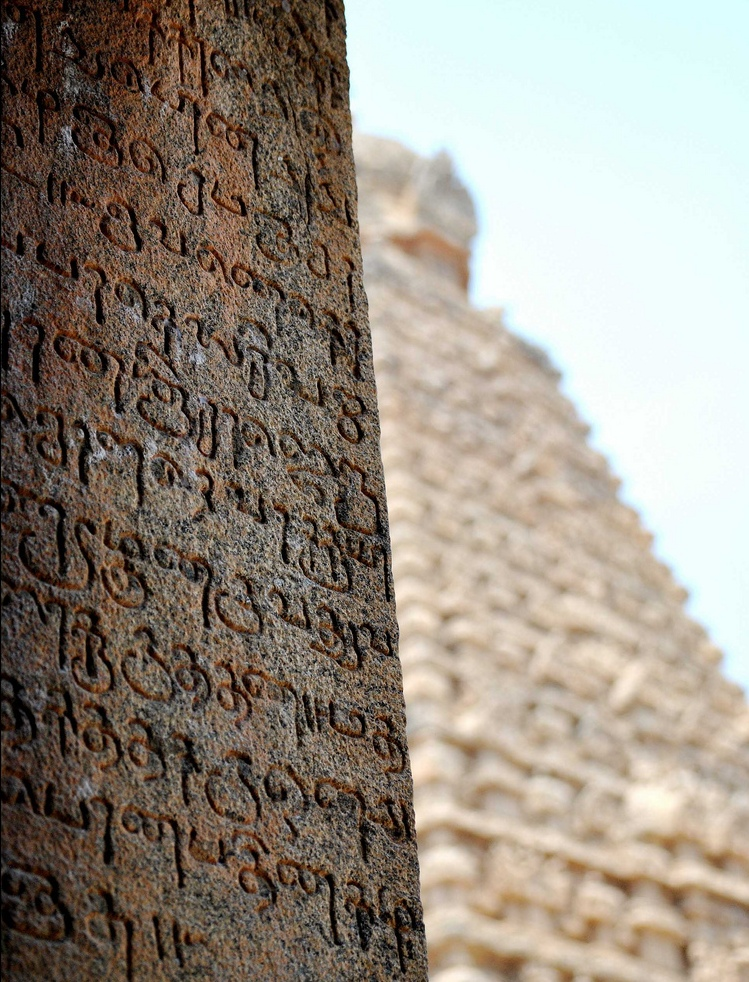
Middle Tamil inscriptions in Vatteluttu script in stone during Chola period c. 1000 CE at Brahadeeswara temple in Thanjavur, Tamil Nadu

The evolution of Old Tamil into Middle Tamil, which is generally taken to have been completed by the 8th century, was characterised by a number of phonological and grammatical changes. In phonological terms, the most important shifts were the virtual disappearance of the aytam (ஃ), an old phoneme, the coalescence of the alveolar and dental nasals, and the transformation of the alveolar plosive into a rhotic. In grammar, the most important change was the emergence of the present tense. The present tense evolved out of the verb kil (கில்), meaning "to be possible" or "to befall". In Old Tamil, this verb was used as an aspect marker to indicate that an action was micro-durative, non-sustained or non-lasting, usually in combination with a time marker such as ṉ (ன்). In Middle Tamil, this usage evolved into a present tense marker – kiṉṟa (கின்ற) – which combined the old aspect and time markers.

=== Modern Tamil ===
The Nannūl remains the standard normative grammar for modern literary Tamil, which therefore continues to be based on Middle Tamil of the 13th century rather than on Modern Tamil. Colloquial spoken Tamil, in contrast, shows a number of changes. The negative conjugation of verbs, for example, has fallen out of use in Modern Tamil – instead, negation is expressed either morphologically or syntactically. Modern spoken Tamil also shows a number of sound changes, in particular, a tendency to lower high vowels in initial and medial positions, and the disappearance of vowels between plosives and between a plosive and rhotic.

Contact with European languages affected written and spoken Tamil. Changes in written Tamil include the use of European-style punctuation and the use of consonant clusters that were not permitted in Middle Tamil. The syntax of written Tamil has also changed, with the introduction of new aspectual auxiliaries and more complex sentence structures, and with the emergence of a more rigid word order that resembles the syntactic argument structure of English.

In 1578, Portuguese Christian missionaries published a Tamil prayer book in old Tamil script named Thambiran Vanakkam, thus making Tamil the first Indian language to be printed and published. The Tamil Lexicon, published by the University of Madras, was one of the earliest dictionaries published in Indian languages.

A strong strain of linguistic purism emerged in the early 20th century, culminating in the Pure Tamil Movement which called for removal of all Sanskritic elements from Tamil. It received some support from Dravidian parties. This led to the replacement of a significant number of Sanskrit loanwords by Tamil equivalents, though many others remain.

According to a 2001 survey, there were 1,863 newspapers published in Tamil, of which 353 were dailies.

== Geographic distribution ==
Tamil is the primary language of the majority of the people residing in Tamil Nadu, Puducherry, (in India) and in the Northern and Eastern provinces of Sri Lanka. The language is spoken among small minority groups in other states of India which include Karnataka, Telangana, Andhra Pradesh, Kerala, Maharashtra, Gujarat, Delhi, Andaman and Nicobar Islands in India and in certain regions of Sri Lanka such as Colombo and the hill country. Tamil or dialects of it were used widely in the state of Kerala as the major language of administration, literature and common usage until the 12th century CE. Tamil was also used widely in inscriptions found in southern Andhra Pradesh districts of Chittoor and Nellore until the 12th century CE. Tamil was used for inscriptions from the 10th through 14th centuries in southern Karnataka districts such as Kolar, Mysore, Mandya and Bengaluru.

There are currently sizeable Tamil-speaking populations descended from colonial-era migrants in Malaysia, Singapore, Philippines, Mauritius, South Africa, Indonesia, Thailand, Burma, Brunei, and Vietnam. Tamil is used as one of the languages of education in Malaysia, along with English, Malay and Mandarin. A large community of Pakistani Tamils speakers exists in Karachi, Pakistan, which includes Tamil-speaking Hindus as well as Christians and Muslims – including some Tamil-speaking Muslim refugees from Sri Lanka. There are about 100 Tamil Hindu families in Madrasi Para colony in Karachi. They speak impeccable Tamil along with Urdu, Punjabi and Sindhi. Many in Réunion, Guyana, Fiji, Suriname, and Trinidad and Tobago have Tamil origins, but only a small number speak the language. In Reunion where the Tamil language was forbidden to be learnt and used in public space by France it is now being relearnt by students and adults. Tamil is also spoken by migrants from Sri Lanka and India in Canada, the United States, the United Arab Emirates, the United Kingdom, South Africa, and Australia.

== Status ==
=== Official status ===
Tamil is used in the note as it is one of the official languages of Sri Lanka.

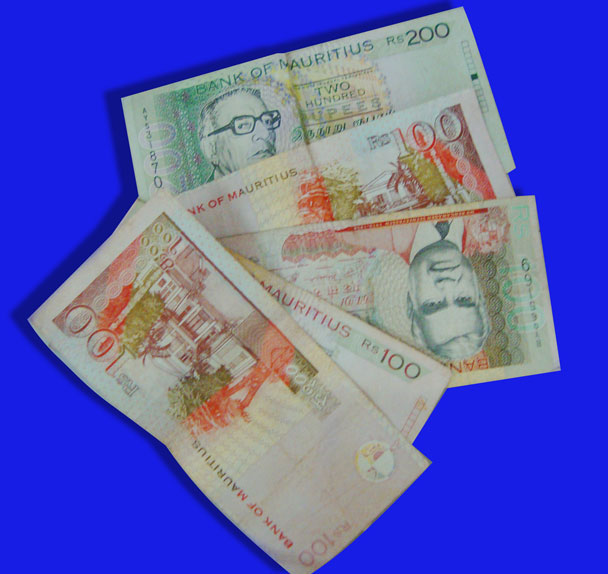
Tamil is used in the note as it is one of the most widely spoken and recognized ancestral languages of Mauritius.

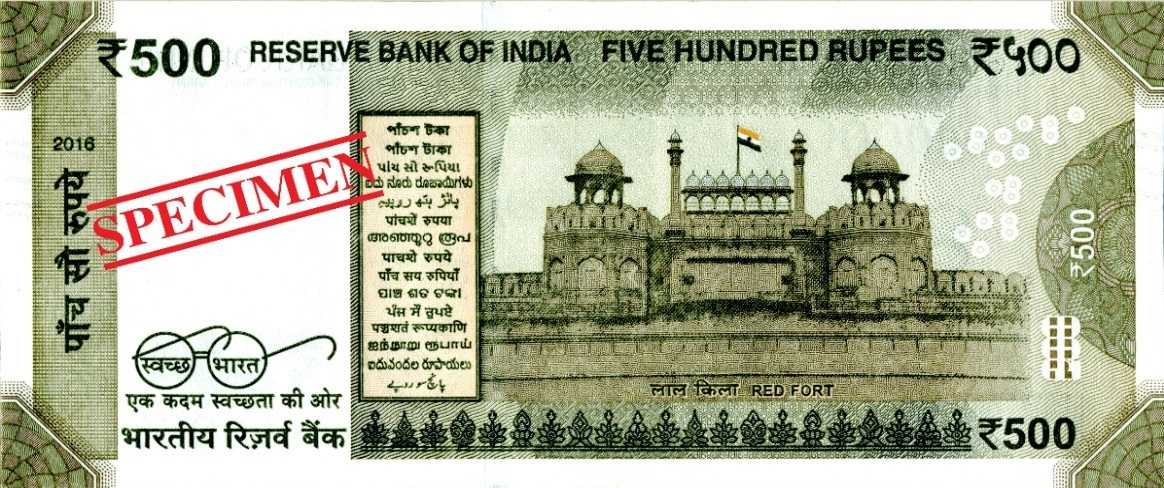
Tamil is featured on Indian banknotes as one of the 15 languages listed on the language panel. It is also included in the Eighth Schedule of the Indian Constitution and is an official language of Tamil Nadu and Puducherry.

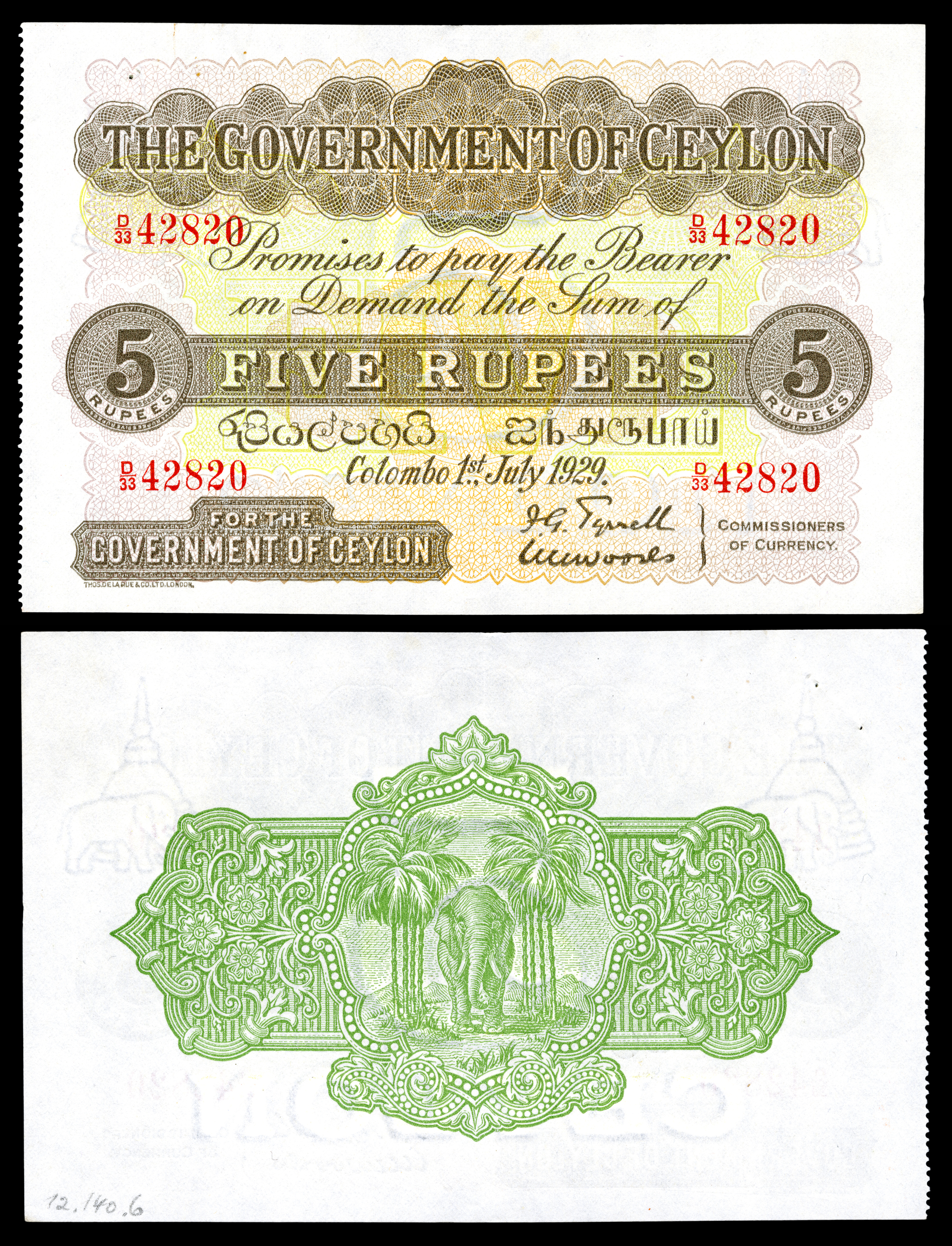

Tamil is the official language of the Indian state of Tamil Nadu and one of the 22 languages under schedule 8 of the constitution of India. It is one of the official languages of the union territories of Puducherry and the Andaman and Nicobar Islands. Tamil is also one of the official languages of Singapore. Tamil is one of the official and national languages of Sri Lanka, along with Sinhala. It was once given nominal official status in the Indian state of Haryana, purportedly as a rebuff to Punjab, though there was no attested Tamil-speaking population in the state, and was later replaced by Punjabi, in 2010.

In addition, with the creation in October 2004 of a legal status for classical languages by the Government of India and following a political campaign supported by several Tamil associations, Tamil became the first legally recognised Classical language of India. The recognition was announced by the contemporaneous President of India, Abdul Kalam, who was a Tamil himself, in a joint sitting of both houses of the Indian Parliament on 6 June 2004.

=== Education ===
In Malaysia, 543 primary education government schools are available fully in Tamil as the medium of instruction. The establishment of Tamil-medium schools has been in process in Myanmar to provide education completely in Tamil language by the Tamils who settled there 200 years ago. Tamil language is available as a course in some local school boards and major universities in Canada and the month of January has been declared "Tamil Heritage Month" by the Parliament of Canada. Tamil enjoys a special status of protection under Article 6(b), Chapter 1 of the Constitution of South Africa and is taught as a subject in schools in KwaZulu-Natal province. Recently, it has been rolled out as a subject of study in schools in the French overseas department of Réunion.

=== Mass media ===
Tamil-language paper media such as newspapers are very common, with a 2001 survey claiming there were 1,863 newspapers published in Tamil (including 353 dailies). Tamil-language digital media is also abundant, with films being especially common.

== Dialects ==
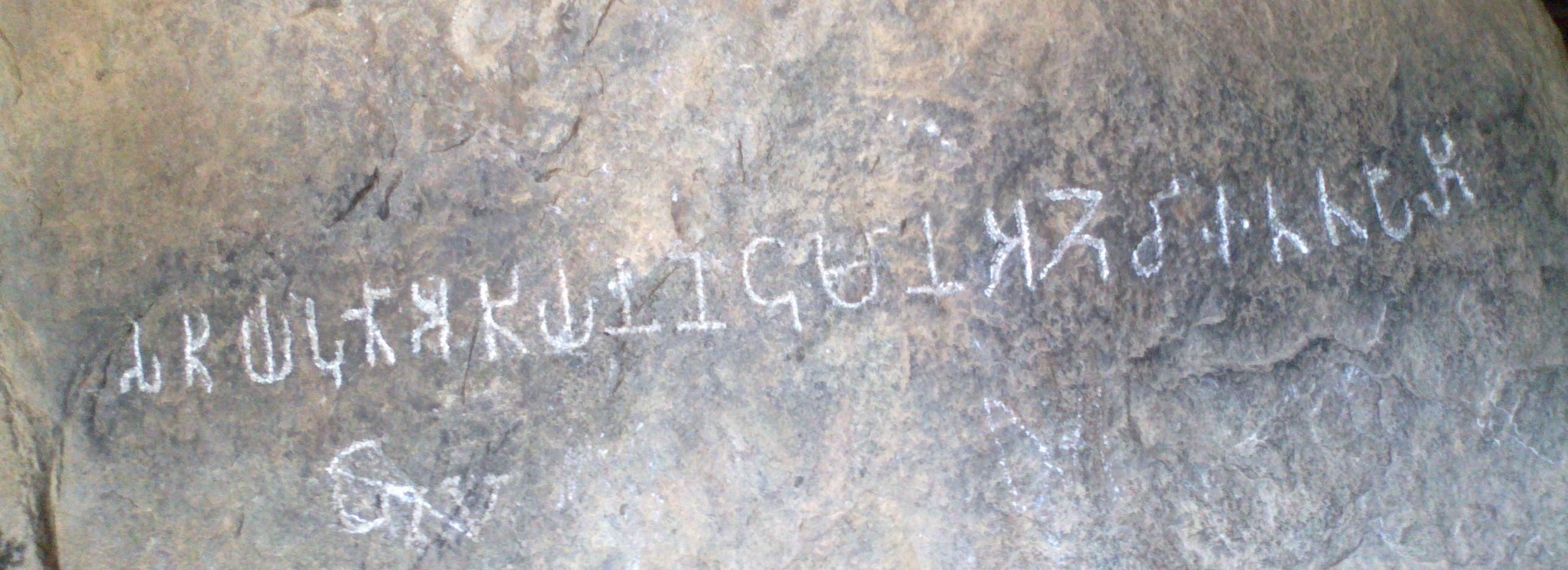
Jambai Tamil Brahmi inscription near Tirukkoyilur in Villupuram district, Tamil Nadu dated to the early Tamil Sangam age (c. 400 BC)

Colloquial Tamil 'Oppaari song'
Oppaari song lamenting death, sung by women during a death ceremony. Here it is the death of a son lamented by the mother.

Pudumaipithan's short story 'Pon Nagaram'
Audio recording of Pudumaipithan's short story 'Pon Nagaram' (showing a few loanwords).

=== Region-specific variations ===
The socio-linguistic situation of Tamil is characterised by diglossia: there are two separate registers varying by socioeconomic status, a high register and a low one. Tamil dialects are primarily differentiated from each other by the fact that they have undergone different phonological changes and sound shifts in evolving from Old Tamil. For example, the word for "here"—iṅku in Centamil (the classic variety)—has evolved into iṅkū in the Kongu dialect of Coimbatore, inga in the dialects of Thanjavur and Palakkad, and iṅkai in some dialects of Sri Lanka. Old Tamil's iṅkaṇ (where kaṇ means place) is the source of iṅkane in the dialect of Tirunelveli, Old Tamil iṅkiṭṭu is the source of iṅkuṭṭu in the dialect of Madurai, and iṅkaṭe in some northern dialects. Even now, in the Coimbatore area, it is common to hear "akkaṭṭa" meaning "that place". Although Tamil dialects do not differ significantly in their vocabulary, there are a few exceptions. The dialects spoken in Sri Lanka retain many words and grammatical forms that are not in everyday use in India, and use many other words slightly differently. Tamil dialects include Thanjai Tamil, Kongu Tamil, Madras Tamil, Madurai Tamil, Nellai Tamil, Kumari Tamil in India; Batticaloa Tamil dialect, Jaffna Tamil dialect, Negombo Tamil dialect in Sri Lanka; and Malaysian Tamil in Malaysia.

==== Loanword variations ====
The dialect of the district of Palakkad in Kerala has many Malayalam loanwords, has been influenced by Malayalam's syntax, and has a distinctive Malayalam accent. Similarly, Tamil spoken in Kanyakumari District has more unique words and phonetic style than Tamil spoken at other parts of Tamil Nadu. The words and phonetics are so different that a person from Kanyakumari district is easily identifiable by their spoken Tamil. Hebbar and Mandyam dialects, spoken by groups of Tamil Vaishnavites who migrated to Karnataka in the 11th century, retain many features of the Vaishnava paribasai, a special form of Tamil developed in the 9th and 10th centuries that reflect Vaishnavite religious and spiritual values. Several castes have their own sociolects which most members of that caste traditionally used regardless of where they come from. It is often possible to identify a person's caste by their speech. For example, Tamil Brahmins tend to speak a variety of dialects that are all collectively known as Brahmin Tamil. These dialects tend to have softer consonants (with consonant deletion also common). These dialects also tend to have many Sanskrit loanwords. Tamil in Sri Lanka incorporates loan words from Portuguese, Dutch, and English.

== Spoken and literary variants ==
Thiruppugazh – Umbartharu – Hamsadhwani
Literary Tamil in hymn 'Umbartharu' (Hamsadhwani) on lord Ganesha from Thiruppugazh (c. 1400s).

Sivagnanam's 'Arivuk kadhaigal'.
Literary Tamil pronunciation. Reading an excerpt from Ma. Po. Si.'s book 'Arivuk kadhaigal' (1900s).

Bharathi's 'Senthamil nadu ennum' song
Literary Tamil pronunciation in song written by Subramanya Bharathi, 'Senthamizh naadennum pothinile' (1900s ).

In addition to its dialects, Tamil exhibits different forms: a classical literary style modelled on the ancient language (sankattamiḻ), a modern literary and formal style (centamiḻ), and a modern colloquial form (koṭuntamiḻ). These styles shade into each other, forming a stylistic continuum. For example, it is possible to write centamiḻ with a vocabulary drawn from caṅkattamiḻ, or to use forms associated with one of the other variants while speaking koṭuntamiḻ.

In modern times, centamiḻ is generally used in formal writing and speech. For instance, it is the language of textbooks, of much of Tamil literature and of public speaking and debate. Modern written Tamil also has a conservative appearance, and it is possible to read eight-century Tamil inscriptions with it. In recent times, however, koṭuntamiḻ has been making inroads into areas that have traditionally been considered the province of centamiḻ. Most contemporary cinema, theatre and popular entertainment on television and radio, for example, is in koṭuntamiḻ, and many politicians use it to bring themselves closer to their audience. The increasing use of koṭuntamiḻ in modern times has led to the emergence of unofficial 'standard' spoken dialects. In India, the 'standard' koṭuntamiḻ, rather than on any one dialect, but has been significantly influenced by the dialects of Thanjavur and Madurai. Spoken Tamil in India is often mixed with English to create the hybrid language Tanglish, which has been growing in popularity, especially in cities. In Sri Lanka, the standard is based on the dialect of Jaffna.

=== Lexical differences ===
There are some words that are only used in Literary Tamil such as: annai (mother), ali (offer), iyalum (possible), illam (house), and karpi (teach).

There are also some words only used in Colloquial Tamil, such as: Le:cu (easy), rompa (much), vantava:lam (unpleasant facts), tatave (times/occasion).

=== Comparative text ===
Literary Tamil	Colloquial Tamil	English
atu avaratu panam. na:n pe:na:vai avanitam kotutten.	atu avaro:da panam. na: pe:na:va avankitte kututtæn.	It is his money. I gave the pen to him.

== Writing system ==
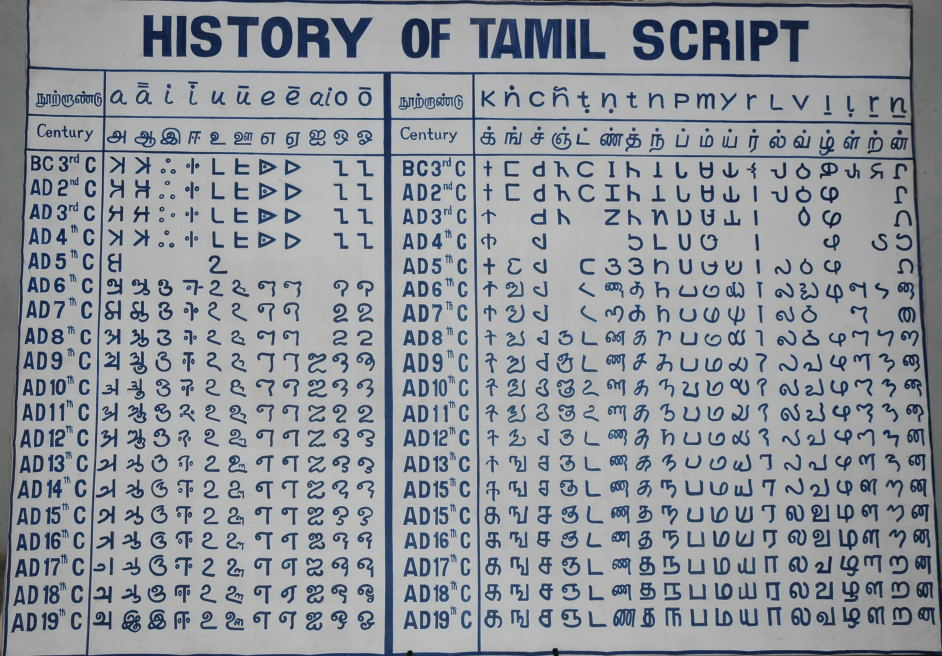
Historical evolution of Tamil writing from the earlier Tamil Brahmi near the top to the current Tamil script at bottom

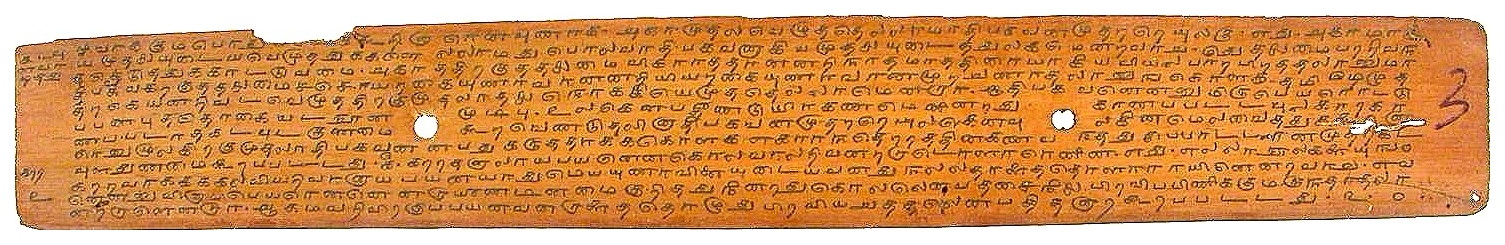
Tirukkuṟaḷ palm leaf manuscript

After Tamil Brahmi fell out of use, Tamil was written using a script called vaṭṭeḻuttu amongst others such as Grantha and Pallava. The current Tamil script consists of 12 vowels, 18 consonants and one special character, the āytam. The vowels and consonants combine to form 216 compound characters, giving a total of 247 characters (12 + 18 + 1 + (12 × 18)). All consonants have an inherent vowel a, as with other Indic scripts. This inherent vowel is removed by adding a tittle called a puḷḷi, to the consonantal sign. For example, ன is ṉa (with the inherent a) and ன் is ṉ (without a vowel). Many Indic scripts have a similar sign, generically called virama, but the Tamil script is somewhat different in that it nearly always uses a visible puḷḷi to indicate a 'dead consonant' (a consonant without a vowel). In other Indic scripts, it is generally preferred to use a ligature or a half form to write a syllable or a cluster containing a dead consonant, although writing it with a visible virama is also possible. The Tamil script does not differentiate voiced and unvoiced plosives. Instead, plosives are articulated with voice depending on their position in a word, in accordance with the rules of Tamil phonology.

In addition to the standard characters, six characters taken from the Grantha script, which was used in the Tamil region to write Sanskrit, are sometimes used to represent sounds not native to Tamil, that is, words adopted from Sanskrit, Prakrit, and other languages. The traditional system prescribed by classical grammars for writing loan-words, which involves respelling them in accordance with Tamil phonology, remains, but is not always consistently applied. ISO 15919 is an international standard for the transliteration of Tamil and other Indic scripts into Latin characters. It uses diacritics to map the much larger set of Brahmic consonants and vowels to Latin script, and thus the alphabets of various languages, including English.

=== Numerals and symbols ===
Apart from the usual numerals, Tamil has numerals for 10, 100 and 1000. Symbols for day, month, year, debit, credit, as above, rupee, and numeral are present as well. Tamil also uses several historical fractional signs.

zero	one	two	three	four	five	six	seven	eight	nine	ten	hundred	thousand
௦	௧	௨	௩	௪	௫	௬	௭	௮	௯	௰	௱	௲

day	month	year	debit	credit	as above	rupee	numeral
௳	௴	௵	௶	௷	௸	௹	௺

== Phonology ==
Tamil consonants
		Labial	Dental	Alveolar	Retroflex	(Alveolo-) Palatal	Velar	Glottal
Nasal		m ம்	(n̪) ந்	n ன்	ɳ ண்	ɲ ஞ்	(ŋ) ங்	
Plosive/Affricate		p ப்	t̪ த்	(trː) ற்ற	ʈ ட்	t͡ʃ ~ t͡ɕ ச்	k க்	
Fricative		(f)		s (z) ஸ்	(ʂ) ஷ்	(ɕ) ஶ்	(x)	(h) ஹ்
Approximant	median	ʋ வ்			ɻ ழ்	j ய்		
Approximant	lateral			l ல்	ɭ ள்			
Vibrant	tap			ɾ ர்				
Vibrant	trill			r ற்				

- /f z ʂ ɕ x h/ are only found in loanwords and may be considered marginal phonemes, though they are traditionally not seen as fully phonemic.

Monophthongs
	Front		Central		Back	
	short	long	short	long	short	long
Close	i இ	iː ஈ	(ɯ) உ		u உ	uː ஊ
Mid	e எ	eː ஏ			o ஒ	oː ஓ
Open			ä அ	äː ஆ		

Tamil has two diphthongs: /aɪ̯/ ஐ and /aʊ̯/ ஔ, the latter of which is restricted to a few lexical items.

=== Phonotactics ===
Tamil has no consonant clusters at the beginning of words and the consonant clusters which do occur are: /mp/, /rt/, /ɳʈ/, /ŋk/, /ṇt/, /ll/, /ɭɭ/, /pp/, /cc/, /tt/, /kk/, /rr/, /ɾk/, /mm/, and /nn/.

== Grammar ==
Tamil tongue twisters.
ல-கரம், ழ-கரம்.
'குலை குலையாய் வாழைப்பழம், மழையில் அழுகி கீழே விழுந்தது.'

(பேச்சுத் தமிழில்) ந-கரம், ட-கரம்.
கொக்கு நெட்ட கொக்கு. நெட்ட கொக்கு இட்ட முட்ட, கட்ட முட்ட.

ழ-கரம்.
ஏழை கிழவன் வாழைப் பழத் தோல் மேல் சருசருக்கி வழுவழுக்கி கீழே விழுந்தான்.

ல-கரம், ள-கரம்.
'அவள் அவலளந்தால், இவள் அவலளப்பாள். இவள் அவலளந்தால், அவள் அவலளப்பாள். அவளும் இவளும் அவல் அளக்காவிட்டால், எவள் அவலளப்பாள் ?'

Tamil employs agglutinative grammar, where suffixes are used to mark noun class, number, and case, verb tense and other grammatical categories. Tamil's standard metalinguistic terminology and scholarly vocabulary is itself Tamil, as opposed to the Sanskrit that is standard for most Indo-Aryan languages.

Much of Tamil grammar is extensively described in the oldest known grammar book for Tamil, the Tolkāppiyam. Modern Tamil writing is largely based on the 13th-century grammar Naṉṉūl which restated and clarified the rules of the Tolkāppiyam, with some modifications. Traditional Tamil grammar consists of five parts, namely eḻuttu, col, poruḷ, yāppu, aṇi. Of these, the last two are mostly applied in poetry.

Tamil words consist of a lexical root to which one or more affixes are attached. Most Tamil affixes are suffixes. Tamil suffixes can be derivational suffixes, which either change the part of speech of the word or its meaning, or inflectional suffixes, which mark categories such as person, number, mood, tense, etc. There is no absolute limit on the length and extent of agglutination, which can lead to long words with many suffixes, which would require several words or a sentence in English. To give an example, the word pōkamuṭiyātavarkaḷukkāka (போகமுடியாதவர்களுக்காக) means "for the sake of those who cannot go" and consists of the following morphemes:

போக முடி ஆத் அ வர் கள் உக்கு ஆக
pōka muṭi āt a var kaḷ ukku āka
go accomplish NEG.IMPRS PTCP NMLZ PL to for

=== Morphology ===
Tamil nouns (and pronouns) are classified into two super-classes (tiṇai)—the "rational" (uyartiṇai), and the "irrational" (akṟiṇai)—which include a total of five classes (pāl, which literally means "gender"). Humans and deities are classified as "rational", and all other nouns (animals, objects, abstract nouns) are classified as irrational. The "rational" nouns and pronouns belong to one of three classes (pāl)—masculine singular, feminine singular, and rational plural. The "irrational" nouns and pronouns belong to one of two classes: irrational singular and irrational plural. The pāl is often indicated through suffixes. The plural form for rational nouns may be used as an honorific, gender-neutral, singular form.

peyarccol (Name-words)
uyartiṇai (rational)			aḵṟiṇai (irrational)	
āṇpāl Male	peṇpāl Female	palarpāl Collective	oṉṟaṉpāl One	palaviṉpāl Many
Example: the Tamil words for "doer"
ceytavaṉ He who did	ceytavaḷ She who did	ceytavar(kaḷ); They who did	ceytatu That which did	ceytavai Those ones which did

Suffixes are used to perform the functions of cases or postpositions. Traditional grammarians tried to group the various suffixes into eight cases corresponding to the cases used in Sanskrit. These were the nominative, accusative, dative, sociative, genitive, instrumental, locative, and ablative. Modern grammarians argue that this classification is artificial, and that Tamil usage is best understood if each suffix or combination of suffixes is seen as marking a separate case. Tamil nouns can take one of four prefixes: i, a, u, and e which are functionally equivalent to the demonstratives in English. For example, the word vazhi (வழி) meaning "way" can take these to produce ivvazhi (இவ்வழி) "this way", avvazhi (அவ்வழி) "that way", uvvazhi (உவ்வழி) "the medial way" (only used in Sri Lanka) and evvazhi (எவ்வழி) "which way".

Tamil verbs are also inflected through the use of suffixes. A typical Tamil verb form will have a number of suffixes, which show person, number, mood, tense, and voice.

- Person and number are indicated by suffixing the oblique case of the relevant pronoun. The suffixes to indicate tenses and voice are formed from grammatical particles, which are added to the stem.
- Tamil has two voices. The first indicates that the subject of the sentence undergoes or is the object of the action named by the verb stem, and the second indicates that the subject of the sentence directs the action referred to by the verb stem.
- Tamil has three simple tenses—past, present, and future—indicated by the suffixes, as well as a series of perfects indicated by compound suffixes. Mood is implicit in Tamil, and is normally reflected by the same morphemes which mark tense categories. Tamil verbs also mark evidentiality, through the addition of the hearsay clitic ām. Verb inflection is shown below using example aḻintukkoṇṭiruntēṉ; (அழிந்துக்கொண்டிருந்தேன்); "(I) was being destroyed".

அழி	ந்து	கொண்டு	இரு	ந்த்	ஏன்
aḻi	ntu	koṇṭu	iru	nt	ēn
root destroy	transitivity marker intransitive	aspect marker continuous	aspect marker continuous	tense marker past tense	person marker first person, singular

Traditional grammars of Tamil do not distinguish between adjectives and adverbs, including both of them under the category uriccol, although modern grammarians tend to distinguish between them on morphological and syntactical grounds. Tamil has many ideophones that act as adverbs indicating the way the object in a given state "says" or "sounds".

Tamil does not have articles. Definiteness and indefiniteness are either indicated by special grammatical devices, such as using the number "one" as an indefinite article, or by the context. In the first person plural, Tamil makes a distinction between inclusive pronouns நாம் nām (we), நம் nam (our) that include the addressee, and exclusive pronouns நாங்கள் nāṅkaḷ (we), எங்கள் eṅkaḷ (our) that do not.

=== Syntax ===
Tamil is a consistently head-final language. The verb comes at the end of the clause, with a typical word order of subject–object–verb (SOV). However, word order in Tamil is also flexible, so that surface permutations of the SOV order are possible with different pragmatic effects. Tamil has postpositions rather than prepositions. Demonstratives and modifiers precede the noun within the noun phrase. Subordinate clauses precede the verb of the matrix clause.

Tamil is a null-subject language. Not all Tamil sentences have subjects, verbs, and objects. It is possible to construct grammatically valid and meaningful sentences which lack one or more of the three. For example, a sentence may only have a verb—such as muṭintuviṭṭatu ("completed")—or only a subject and object, without a verb such as atu eṉ vīṭu ("That [is] my house"). Tamil does not have a copula (a linking verb equivalent to the word is). The word is included in the translations only to convey the meaning more easily.

== Vocabulary ==
The vocabulary of Tamil is mainly Dravidian. A strong sense of linguistic purism is found in Modern Tamil, which opposes the use of foreign loanwords. Nonetheless, a number of words used in classical and modern Tamil are loanwords from the languages of neighbouring groups, or with whom the Tamils had trading links, including Malay (e.g. cavvarici "sago" from Malay sāgu), Chinese (for example, campān "skiff" from Chinese san-pan) and Greek (for example, ora from Greek ὥρα). In more modern times, Tamil has imported words from Urdu and Marathi, reflecting groups that have influenced the Tamil area at times, and from neighbouring languages such as Telugu, Kannada, and Sinhala. During the modern period, words have also been adapted from European languages, such as Portuguese, French, and English.

The strongest effect of purism in Tamil has been on words taken from Sanskrit. During its history, Tamil, along with other Dravidian languages like Telugu, Kannada, Malayalam etc., was influenced by Sanskrit in terms of vocabulary, grammar and literary styles, reflecting the increased trend of Sanskritisation in the Tamil country. Tamil vocabulary never became quite as heavily Sanskritised as that of the other Dravidian languages, and unlike in those languages, it was and remains possible to express complex ideas (including in science, art, religion and law) without the use of Sanskrit loan words. In addition, Sanskritisation was actively resisted by a number of authors of the late medieval period, culminating in the 20th century in a movement called taṉit tamiḻ iyakkam (meaning "pure Tamil movement"), led by Parithimaar Kalaignar and Maraimalai Adigal, which sought to remove the accumulated influence of Sanskrit on Tamil. As a result of this, Tamil in formal documents, literature and public speeches has seen a marked decline in the use Sanskrit loan words in the past few decades, under some estimates having fallen from 40 to 50% to about 20%. As a result, the Prakrit and Sanskrit loan words used in modern Tamil are, unlike in some other Dravidian languages, restricted mainly to some spiritual terminology and abstract nouns.

In the 20th century, institutions and learned bodies have, with government support, generated technical dictionaries for Tamil containing neologisms and words derived from Tamil roots to replace loan words from English and other languages. As of 2019, the language had a listed vocabulary of over 470,000 unique words, including those from old literary sources. In November 2019, the state government issued an order to add 9,000 new words to the vocabulary.

== Influence ==
Words of Tamil origin occur in other languages. For example, scholars trace the origin of the word 'rice' in English and other European languages to Tamil arici / அரிசி, through loans from 400 BCE Tamil to Hebrew and ultimately to Greek óruza / όρυζα. Another notable example of a word in worldwide use with Dravidian (not specifically Tamil) etymology is orange, via Sanskrit nāraṅga from a Dravidian predecessor of Tamil nārttaṅkāy 'fragrant fruit'. One suggestion as to the origin of the word anaconda is the Tamil anaikkonda 'having killed an elephant'. Examples in English include cheroot (curuṭṭu meaning 'rolled up'), mango (from māṅgāy), mulligatawny (from miḷaku taṇṇīr 'pepper water'), pariah (from paṟaiyar), curry (from kaṟi), catamaran (from kaṭṭu maram 'bundled logs'), and congee (from kañji 'rice porridge' or 'gruel').

== Sample text ==
The following is a sample text in literary Tamil of Article 1 of the Universal Declaration of Human Rights. The first line is the Tamil script; the second is romanized Tamil; the third is the International Phonetic Alphabet; the fourth is the gloss.

உறுப்புரை 1: மனிதப் பிறவியினர் சகலரும் சுதந்திரமாகவே பிறக்கின்றனர்; அவர்கள் மதிப்பிலும், உரிமைகளிலும் சமமானவர்கள், அவர்கள் நியாயத்தையும் மனசாட்சியையும் இயற்பண்பாகப் பெற்றவர்கள். அவர்கள் ஒருவருடனொருவர் சகோதர உணர்வுப் பாங்கில் நடந்துகொள்ளல் வேண்டும்.
Uṟuppurai 1: Maṉitap piṟaviyiṉar cakalarum cutantiramākavē piṟakkiṉṟaṉar; avarkaḷ matippilum, urimaikaḷilum camamāṉavarkaḷ, avarkaḷ niyāyattaiyum maṉaccāṭciyaiyum iyaṟpaṇpākap peṟṟavarkaḷ. Avarkaḷ oruvaruṭaṉoruvar cakōtara uṇarvup pāṅkil naṭantukoḷḷal vēṇṭum.
urupːurai ond̺rʉ mənid̪ə piriʋijinər səgələrum sud̪ən̪d̪irəmaːgəʋeː pirəkːin̺d̺ranər əvərgəɭ məd̪ipːilum uriməigəɭilum səməmaːnəʋərgəɭ əvərgəɭ nijaːjatːəijum mənətt͡ʃaːʈt͡ʃijəijum ijərpəɳbaːgə pet̺rəʋərgəɭ əvərgəɭ oruʋəruɖənoruʋər sagoːdəɾə uɳərʋɨ paːŋgil nəɖən̪d̪ʉkoɭɭəl veːɳɖum
Section 1: Human beings all-of-them freely {are born}. They rights-in-and dignities-in-and equal-ones. They law-and conscience-and intrinsically possessed-ones. They among-one-another brotherly feeling spirit-in act must.
Article 1: All human beings are born free and equal in dignity and rights. They possess conscience and reason. Therefore, everyone should act in a spirit of brotherhood towards each other.

== See also ==
- List of countries where Tamil is an official language
- List of languages by first written accounts
- Tamil keyboard
- Tamil population by cities
- Tamil population by nation
- Tamil Loanwords in other languages
- Tamil Shorthand
- Geolinguistics
- Language geography
