= Negombo Tamil =

Negombo Tamil may refer to:

- Negombo Tamils, native Sri Lankan Tamils who live in the western Gampaha and Puttalam districts
- Negombo Tamil dialect, a language dialect used by the fishers of Negombo, Sri Lanka
