= Negombo Tamils =

Ethnicity in Sri Lanka

Negombo Tamils or Puttalam Tamils are the Tamil speaking ethnic Karavas who live in the western Gampaha and Puttalam districts of Sri Lanka. They are distinguished from other Tamils from the island nation by their unique dialects, one of which is known as Negombo Tamil dialect. Other sub categories of native Tamils of Sri Lanka are Jaffna Tamils or Northern Tamils and Batticalao Tamils or Eastern Tamils from the traditional Tamil dominant North and East of the Island nation. Negombo is a principal coastal city in the Gampaha District and Puttalam is also the principal city within the neighbouring Puttalam District.

== Assimilation ==
The main feature of the Negombo Tamils is the continuing process of assimilation into the majority Sinhalese ethnic group, a process known as Sinhalisation. This process is enabled via a number of caste myths and legends.

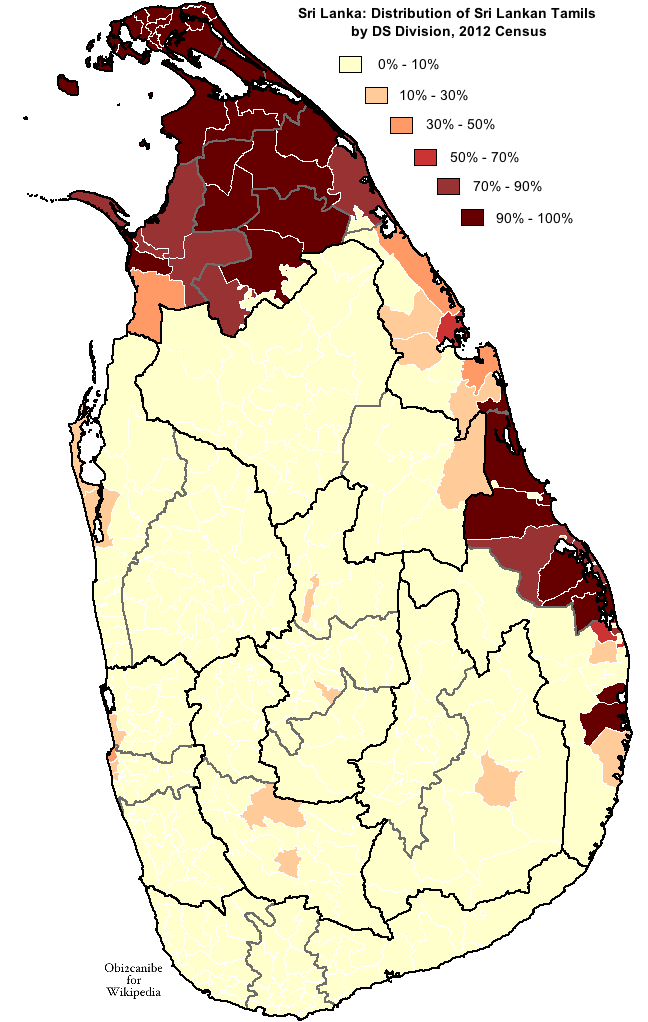
Distribution of Sri Lankan Tamil people in Sri Lanka by DS Division according 2012 census including the Negambo and Puttalam area

In the Gampaha district ethnic Tamils have historically inhabited the coastal belt, as in the neighboring Puttalam district, which until the first two decades of the twentieth century had a substantial ethnic Tamil population, of whom the majority were Catholics and a minority were Hindus. According to L.J.B. Turner, although the distinction between Sinhalese and Tamils of the present-day Sri Lanka is so marked, in the past there was considerable fusion between these ethnic groups. According to him the results of this fusion are most obvious on the western coast between Negombo and Puttalam, where a large proportion of the villagers, though they call themselves Sinhalese, speak Tamil and are undoubtedly of Tamil descent. According to local legends, their ancestors were captives from India or imported weavers and other artisans.

This historic process was embraced by the educational policies of a local bishop, Edmund Peiris, who was instrumental in changing the medium of education from Tamil to Sinhala.

== Survival of Tamil heritage ==
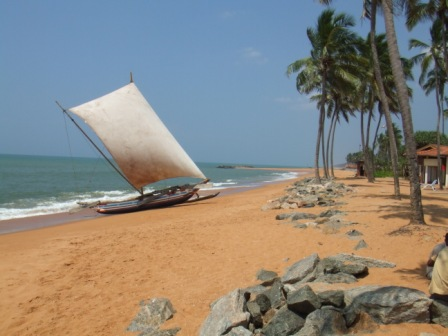
Traditional fishing oru or outrigger canoe at Negombo beach is the traditional craft of the island, particularly the Sinhalese people, the vallam, thepam (crafts without an outrigger) and cattamaran (tied logs) are the traditional crafts of South India

Due to the bilingualism of some residents of both these districts, especially those who are traditional fishermen, the Tamil language survives as a lingua franca amongst migrating fishermen across the island. It is estimated that the Negombo dialect of Tamil language is spoken by perhaps 50,000 people who otherwise identify themselves as Sinhalese. This number does not include others who may speak various varieties of the Tamil language north of Negombo city towards Puttalam. Today most of those who retain their Tamil identity are Hindus and are mostly concentrated in a single coastal village called Udappu. This village has approximately 15,000 inhabitants and has become refuge for other Tamils displaced due to the Sri Lankan civil war from the rest of the country. There are also some Tamil Christians belonging to various Christian sects (mostly Catholics) who maintain their Tamil heritage throughout both these districts in major cities such as Negombo, Chilaw, Puttalam and in villages such as Mampuri.

Negombo Tamil is the fact that the Karavas immigrated to Sri Lanka much later than Tamils immigrated to Jaffna. This would suggest that the Negombo dialect continued to evolve in the Coromandel Coast before it arrived in Sri Lanka and began to get influenced by Sinhala. So, in some ways, the dialect is closer to those spoken in Tamil Nadu than is Jaffna Tamil.

Tamil heritage is also maintained in place names in both these districts. Outside of the Tamil-dominated North East, Puttalam district has the highest percentage of place names of Tamil origin in Sri Lanka. There are also composite or hybrid place names in both these districts. The juxtaposition of Sinhala and Tamil place names indicated the peaceful coexistence of people of both language groups as well as the gradual assimilation process. There are also numerous Hindu temples across the districts mostly dedicated to Hindu village deities such as Ayyanar, who is also worshiped as Ayyanayake by the Sinhalese people. Other deities include Kali, Kannaki and Lord Shiva, whose famous temple at Munneswaram was built by Raja Raja Cholan a Tamil king.

== See also ==
- Colombo Chettys
- Bharatakula
- Karave
- Place names in Sri Lanka
