= Tamil phonology =

Phonology of the Tamil language

The phonology of Tamil is characterised by the presence of "true-subapical" retroflex consonants and multiple rhotic consonants. Its script does not distinguish between voiced and unvoiced consonants; phonetically, voice is assigned depending on a consonant's position in a word, voiced intervocalically and after nasals except when geminated. Tamil phonology permits few consonant clusters, which can never be word initial.

A Tamil tongue twister
The sentence literally means, "A poor old man slipped on a banana peel and fell sprawling." ("ஏழை கிழவன் வாழைப்பழத் தோல் மேல், சருசருக்கி வழுவழுக்கி கீழே விழுந்தான்.")

== Vowels ==
Monophthongs of Tamil, from Keane

The vowels are called உயிரெழுத்து uyireḻuttu ('life letter'). The vowels are classified into short and long (five of each type) and two diphthongs.

The long (netil) vowels are about twice as long as the short (kuṟil) vowels. The diphthongs are usually pronounced about 1.5 times as long as the short vowels, though most grammatical texts place them with the long vowels.

Monophthongs
	Front		Central		Back	
	short	long	short	long	short	long
Close	i இ	iː ஈ	(ɯ) உ		u உ	uː ஊ
Mid	e எ	eː ஏ			o ஒ	oː ஓ
Open			ä அ	äː ஆ		

Tamil has two diphthongs: /aɪ̯/ ஐ and /aʊ̯/ ஔ, the latter of which is restricted to a few lexical items like vau and vauvāl. Some like Krishnamurti consider the diphthongs as clusters of /a/ + /j, ʋ/ as they pattern with other VC clusters. There are clusters of /ej, oj, uj, eːj, aːj, oːj, uːj/ as in cey, koy, uy, tēy, kāy, kōy, tūymai but they are never taken as diphthongs. The way some words are written also varies e.g. avvai as அவ்வை (avvai), ஔவை (auvai) or அவ்வய் (avvay) (first one most common). Word final /u/ is pronounced as [ɯ~ɨ], it is called a குற்றியலுகரம் (kuṟṟiyalukaram) "short u" (as it has only half a sound unit, compared to 1, 1.5 or 2 of other vowels) in tolkāppiyam and it is unrounded even in literary Tamil; in spoken Tamil it can occur medially as well in some words after the first syllable. Word final [u] occurs in some names, chiefly nicknames like rājēndraṉ as rāju but also some other terms of the form (C)VCu as in karu, puḻu. There is a minimal pair naṭu "center", naṭŭ "to plant". In declensions the full u is not deleted like the half u like naṭuvillai - naṭillai.

Old grammars mention that there are 1 (regulars), 2 (long vowels, geminates), 3 (extra long vowels), 1.5 (diphthongs), 0.5 (kuṟṟiyalukaram, kuṟṟiyalikaram) and 0.25 (makarakkuṟukkam) units of sounds: kal, kāl, orūu, vau, atu, pōṉm. 3 units are for the extra long vowels as in kurīi, ēe, kiḻāaṉ, makaṭūu.

Colloquially, an initial /i(:)/ or /e(:)/ may have a [ʲ] onglide; likewise, an initial /o(:)/ or /u(:)/ may have a [ʷ] onglide, e.g. [ʲeɾi] and [ʷoɾɯ]. In Karnatakan dialects short versions of them may further become [a, ʋa], eg. eṉṟu, utai /ɐnnʉ, ʋɐd̪iki/. This is very light or does not occur in Sri Lankan dialects.

Indian Colloquial Tamil also has nasalized vowels formed from word final vowel + nasal cluster (except for /Vɳ/ where an epenthetic u is added after it). Long vowel + nasal just nasalizes the vowel, short vowel + nasal may also change the quality, for example, /an/ gets fronted to [ɛ̃] அவன் /aʋan/ becomes [aʋɛ̃] ([aʋæ̃] for some speakers), /am/ gets rounded to [õ] மரம் /maɾam/ becomes [maɾõ], நீங்களும் /niːŋkaɭum/ becomes [n̪iːŋɡaɭũ], வந்தான் /ʋan̪t̪a:n/ becomes [ʋan̪d̪ã:], the remaining vowels only get nasalized. There is word final nasals in loanwords like ṭaim, ōm, sāmān. Karnataka's dialects have [ʊ̃] for /an/ and -m is just deleted, eg. maram [mɐrʊ].

In spoken Tamil sometimes an epenthetic vowel u is added to words ending in consonants, e.g. nil > nillu, āḷ > āḷu, nāḷ > nāḷu (nā in some dialects), vayal > vayalu etc. If another word is joined at the end, it is deleted.

Colloquially, the high short vowels /i/, /u/ are lowered to [e] and [o] when next to a short consonant and /a, aɪ/. For example, இடம் /iʈam/ becomes [eɖam]; and உடம்பு /uʈampu/ becomes [oɖambɯ]. This is an instance of lowering umlaut. It doesn't happen in pronouns and some other words e.g. இவன் ivaṉ and எவன் evaṉ are different words. /aɪ/ also monophthongises to an /e, a/ but it causes the lowering of /i, u/ before it, e.g. ilai > ele/ela. Additionally, the front long vowels /eː/ and /iː/ are subject to retraction when present in the first syllable of a bisyllabic word and followed by a retroflex consonant. As such, /ʋiːʈu/ "house" becomes [ʋɨːɖɪ̈], but its inflected form /ʋiːʈʈukku/ remains [ʋiːʈ(ː)uk(ː)ɪ̈]. Likewise, /t̪eːʈu/ "search!" becomes [t̪əːɖɪ̈], but /t̪eːʈinaːn/ "(he) searched" remains [t̪eːɖinãː]. The presence and degree of retraction for each vowel may be different; it varies between dialects and even individual speakers. Almost all words end with vowels in spoken Tamil.

For some speakers in spoken Tamil the front vowels /i(:), e(:)/ get rounded to their corresponding rounded back vowels when they are after a labial consonant /m, p, ʋ/ and before a retroflex consonant, some words with it are quite acceptable like பெண் /peɳ/ > பொண்/பொண்ணு [poɳ~poɳ:ɯ] but others like வீடு /ʋi:ʈu/ > வூடு [ʋu:ɖɯ] are less accepted and may even be considered vulgar.

Another change in spoken Tamil is vowel harmony, where vowels change their height to be more similar to nearby vowels: e.g. literary Tamil /koʈu/ > spoken Tamil [kuɖɯ].

== Consonants ==
The consonants are known as மெய்யெழுத்து meyyeḻuttu ('body letters'). The consonants are classified into three categories with six in each category: valliṉam ('hard'), melliṉam ('soft' or nasal), and iṭayiṉam ('medium'). Tamil has very restricted consonant clusters (for example, there are no word-initial clusters). There are well defined rules for voicing stops in the written form of Tamil, Centamiḻ (the period of Tamil history before Sanskrit words were borrowed). Stops are voiceless when at the start of a word, in a consonant cluster with another stop and when geminated. They are voiced otherwise.

Tamil is characterized by its use of more than one type of coronal consonants: like many of the other languages of India, it contains a series of retroflex consonants. Notably, the Tamil retroflex series includes the retroflex approximant /ɻ/ (ழ) (example Tamiḻ; often transcribed 'zh'). Among the other Dravidian languages, the retroflex approximant also occurs in Malayalam, old Badaga, old Telugu and old Kannada. In most dialects of colloquial Tamil, this consonant is seen as shifting to the retroflex lateral approximant /ɭ/ in the south and palatal approximant /j/ in the north.

The proto-Dravidian alveolar stop *ṯ developed into an alveolar trill /r/ in the Southern and South Central Dravidian languages while *ṯṯ and *ṉṯ remained (modern ṟṟ, ṉṟ).

[n] and [n̪] are mostly in complementary distribution and are predictable; namely, [n̪] occurs word initially and before /t̪/, while [n] occurs everywhere else. [n̪] occurs in other places from compounding of words starting with it and geminates from sandhi, eg. annēram (a-nēram), ainūṟu (ai-nūṟu) but speakers might use the alveolar nasal there instead.

/ɲ/ is rare word initially and is mostly only found before /t͡ɕ/ word medially; it occurs in geminated form as in āññai or maññai, mostly from Sanskritic loans with jñ or sandhi where the 2nd word starts with ñ aññāṉam (a-ñāṉam), in singular form in some rare words pūñai, añal and in compounds like aṟiñaṉ. Only around 5 words have doubled intervocalic [ŋ], all are different forms of the word aṅṅaṉam "that manner", apart from that [ŋ] only occurs before /k/.

A chart of the Tamil consonant phonemes in the International Phonetic Alphabet follows:

Standard Tamil consonants
		Labial	Dental	Alveolar	Retroflex	(Alveolo-) Palatal	Velar
Nasal		m ம்	n̪ ந்	n ன்	ɳ ண்	ɲ ஞ்	ŋ ங்
Plosive/Affricate		p ப்	t̪ த்		ʈ ட்	t͡ʃ ~ t͡ɕ ச்	k க்
Approximant	median	ʋ வ்			ɻ ழ்	j ய்	
Approximant	lateral			l ல்	ɭ ள்		
Vibrant	tap			ɾ ர்			
Vibrant	trill			r ற்			

Common Spoken Tamil consonants
		Labial	Dental/ Alveolar	Retroflex	(Alveolo-) Palatal	Velar	Glottal
Nasal		m	n	ɳ (Note: some dialects lack this)			
Plosive/ Affricate	voiceless	p	t̪	ʈ	t͡ʃ	k	
Plosive/ Affricate	voiced	b	d̪	ɖ	d͡ʒ	ɡ	
Fricative		(f)	s⠀(z)	(ʂ)	(ɕ)	(x)	(h)
Approximant	median	ʋ		(ɻ) (Note: some dialects have this)	j		
Approximant	lateral		l	ɭ			
Vibrant	tap		ɾ				
Vibrant	trill		(r)				

1. /f z ʂ ɕ/ are only found in loanwords and may be considered marginal phonemes, though they are traditionally not seen as fully phonemic.
2. Intervocalic /k/ is pronounced as [ɣ ~ h] by Indian Tamils and [x] in Sri Lanka.
3. For most speakers in spoken Tamil the distinction between the tap and trill is lost except in the southern Kanyakumari dialect.
4. In most spoken Indian dialects, /rr/ [tːr] merges with /t̪t̪/ while some others keep them as [tːr]. /nr/ merges with /nn ~ ɳɳ/ if the preceding vowel is short or /n~ɳ/ if it is long like in literary Tamil. In speech, /pɐrri, pɐt̪ɐrrɐm, kɐɻɐnrɐt̪u, onru, muːnru, panri/ are realized as [pɐt̪t̪i, pɐðɐʈ(ː)ɔ̃, kɐɭ̆ɐɳɖɐðɯ, (w)oɳɳɯ~(w)onnɯ, muːɳɯ, pɐnni].
5. /t͡ʃ/ in spoken Tamil varies significantly. Some speakers pronounce it as [s] intervocalically and as an affricate initially, while others have [s] both initially and intervocalically. A final group of speakers has [t͡ʃ] before certain vowels and [s] before others, e.g. சின்ன [t͡ʃin:a] "small" but சாவி [sa:ʋi] "key". However, there are words where the pronunciation is fixed—for example, ceṉṉai and sēlam cannot be pronounced as [senːaɪ̯] and [t͡ʃeːlam]. [ʃ] is also attested as an allophone in certain dialects, eg. cari [ʃɐɾi]. /t͡ʃː ɲt͡ʃ/ are always [tːʃ n̠ʲd̠ʒ].
6. In spoken Tamil /j/ might cause palatalization to the adjacent consonants and then get assimilated or deleted, e.g. literary Tamil aintu, spoken Tamil añju.
7. In spoken Tamil intervocalic /k, ʋ/ may be deleted sometimes as in /poːkiraːj/ as [poːrɛ] and sometime /ɻ/ with compensatory lengthening of the vowel as in /poɻut̪u/ as [poːd̪ɯ]. Word finally glides, mainly /j/ are generally deleted unless if the word is monosyllabic where its doubled e.g. cey > seyyi, rūpāy > rūbā. Word final l and ḷ in polysyllabic words are deleted especially in pronouns but reappear when a suffix is added e.g. nīṅkaḷ > nīṅga, similar to French liaison.
8. l and ḷ gets assimilated to ṟ, ṭ before plosives and ṉ, ṇ before nasals in literary Tamil, e.g. vil, kēḷ, nal, veḷ > viṟka, kēṭka, naṉmai, veṇmai, before c, ṇ too becomes ṭ, eg. kāṇ-ci > kāṭci; in spoken Tamil it is deleted and the next consonant is doubled. Before coronal stops, the stops assimilate to the lateral's POA and the lateral is deleted like in the past tense forms of verbs ending with l and ḷ, e.g. kol-ntu, koḷ-ntu, vil-ttu > koṉṟu, koṇṭu, viṟṟu.
9. As in Proto Dravidian, literary Tamil words can't begin with an alveolar or retroflex consonant but in spoken Tamil some words begin with r and l because of deletion of the initial vowel, e.g. literary Tamil iraṇṭu, ulāttu, spoken Tamil raṇḍu~reṇḍu, lāttu. In loanwords, a short i, u or a is added before them, e.g. Skt. loka, Tamil ulakam.
10. In loanwords, the voiced and aspirated plosives are all loaned as the plain plosive. Of the fricatives, h is loaned as k, the sibilants as c, ts as cc and kṣ as ṭc; sometimes s and ṣ are loaned as t and ṭ as in mātam, varuṭam, ilaṭcam (Skt. māsa, varṣa, lakṣa) and kṣ as k(k) or c(c) as in kēttiram~cēttiram, piccai from Sanskrit kṣetra, bhikṣā.
11. Words can only end with /m, n, ɳ, l, ɭ, ɾ, ɻ, j/ in literary Tamil.
12. Natively the only allowed clusters are C:, ṭP, NP, RP, RP:, RNP (where P = plosive, N = nasal, R = liquid, : = gemination, C = any consonant) most common are C: and NP; any heterorganic cluster indicates a morpheme boundary. Others clusters occurring in loanwords are split by vowels or simplified, e.g. varṣa > varuṭam.
13. In Sri Lankan Tamil dialects, word initial voiceless plosives may be aspirated dialectally, intervocalic /k/ may be [x ~ ɣ ~ h] and /t̪/ maybe [d̪ ~ ð] or rarely [θ ~ t̪]; word final nasals are always preserved; <c> tends to be [t͡ʃ ~ ʃ ~ s] or rarely [t͡s] initially depending on the dialect and speaker, a rare [z] was noted for a speaker intervocalically, eg kaṭutāci [kɐɖuðaːzi]; <ṟṟ, nṟ> may be [tt ~ t̪t̪, nd ~ ɳɖ].
14. Some colloquial dialects merge ṇ, ḷ with n, l.
15. Kongu Tamil has word final /ŋ/ as word final /ŋkV/ becomes /ŋ/, e.g. literary Tamil vāṅka, Kongu Tamil vāṅ.

The voiceless consonants are voiced in different positions.

Tamil stop allophones
Place	Initial	Geminate	Medial	Post-nasal
Velar	k	kː	g ~ x ~ ɣ ~ h	ɡ
Palatal	tʃ, s	tːɕ	s	dʑ ~ dʒ
Retroflex	—	ʈː	ɖ ~ ɽ	ɖ
Alveolar	—	tːr	r	(d)r
Dental	t̪	t̪ː	d̪ ~ ð	d̪
Labial	p	pː	b ~ β	b

In modern Tamil, however, voiced plosives occur initially in loanwords. Geminate stops get simplified to singleton unvoiced stops after long vowels, suggesting the primary cue is now voicing (cf. kūṭṭam-kūṭam becoming kūṭam-kūḍam in modern speakers). Altogether, we see a shift in progress towards phonemic voicing, more advanced in some dialects than others.

Historically [j] was a possible allophone of medial -c- now the terms with [j] have solidified, compare Kannada which only had [s] as the medial allophone, Tamil ñāyiṟu, Kannada nēsaru. In some cases both remained as in ucir, uyir. There are also cases where the opposite happened due to hypercorrection, eg. Tamil kayiṟu, Madurai Tamil kacaru, kacuru, kaciru even though the word didn't originally have a -c-. There are also cases where it became t mutalai/mutaḷai/mucali, Kannada mosaḷe and disappeared after lengthening the previous vowel nilā, Kodava nelaci.

=== Āytam ===
Old Tamil had a phoneme called the āytam, which was written as ‘ஃ'. Tamil grammarians of the time classified it as a dependent phoneme (or restricted phoneme) (cārpeḻuttu). The rules of pronunciation given in the Tolkāppiyam, a text on the grammar of old Tamil, says that the āytam in old Tamil patterned with semivowels and it occurred after a short vowel and before a stop; it either lengthened the previous vowel, geminated the stop or was lost if the following segment is phonetically voiced in the environment. It is said to be the descendant of Proto Dravidian laryngeal *H. The āytam in modern Tamil is used to transcribe foreign phones like ஃப் (ஃp) for [f], ஃஜ (ஃj) for [z], ஃஸ (ஃs) for [z, ʒ] and ஃக (ஃk) for [x], similar to a nuqta.

== Overview ==
Unlike most Indic scripts, Tamil does not have distinct letters for aspirated consonants and they are found as allophones of the normal stops. The Tamil script also lacks distinct letters for voiced and unvoiced stops as their pronunciations depend on their location in a word. For example, the voiceless stop [p] occurs at the beginning of words while the voiced stop [b] cannot. In the middle of words, voiceless stops commonly occur as a geminated pair like -pp-, while voiced stops do not. Only voiced stops can appear medially and after a corresponding nasal. Thus both the voiced and voiceless stops can be represented by the same script in Tamil without ambiguity, the script denoting only the place and broad manner of articulation (stop, nasal, etc.). The Tolkāppiyam cites detailed rules as to when a letter is to be pronounced with voice and when it is to be pronounced unvoiced. The only exceptions to these rules are the letters ச and ற as they are pronounced medially as [s] and [r] respectively.

Some loan words are pronounced in Tamil as they were in the source language, even if this means that consonants which should be unvoiced according to the Tolkāppiyam are voiced.

=== Elision ===
Elision is the reduction in the duration of sound of a phoneme when preceded by or followed by certain other sounds. There are well-defined rules for elision in Tamil. They are categorised into different classes based on the phoneme which undergoes elision.

1.	Kuṟṟiyal ukaram (short nature u)	the vowel u
2.	Kuṟṟiyal ikaram (short nature i)	the vowel i
3.	Aikārak-kuṟukkam (ai shortening)	the diphthong ai
4.	Aukārak-kuṟukkam (au shortening)	the diphthong au
5.	Āytak-kuṟukkam (ḵ shortening)	the special character aḵ (āytam)
6.	Makārak-kuṟukkam (m shortening)	the phoneme m

1. Kuṟṟiyal ukaram refers to the vowel /u/ turning into the close back unrounded vowel [ɯ] at the end of words (e.g.: 'āṟu' (meaning 'six') will be pronounced [aːrɯ]).

2. Kuṟṟiyal ikaram refers to the short /i/ which is formed when a word ending with kuṟṟiyalukaram is joined with a word starting with the consonant /j/ (e.g.: 'kāṭṭu yāḻi' > 'kāṭṭiyāḻi' (meaning 'wild Yazhi') will be pronounced [kaːʈʈĭjaːɻi]).

3. Aikārak-kuṟukkam refers to the short length of /ɐi̯/ of 1.5 units compared to the expected 2 (e.g.: 'kai' (meaning 'hand') will be pronounced [kɐi̯]).

4. Aukārak-kuṟukkam refers to the short length of /ɐu̯/ of 1.5 units compared to the expected 2 (e.g.: 'vau' (meaning 'to snatch') will be pronounced [ʋɐu̯]).

6. Makārak-kuṟukkam refers to the shortening of m to 0.25 units word finally after other nasals. (e.g.: 'poṉm' (meaning 'gold') will be pronounced [ponm̆]).

== Changes from Proto Dravidian to Standard Tamil ==
=== Consonants ===
1. Deletion of y initially e.g. PD. *yĀṯu, Ta. āṟu "river", it was preserved in a few words in old Tamil, there are even less in Modern Tamil.
2. Deletion of some initial *c- through c > s > h > ∅ e.g. PD. *cīntu > Ta. īñcu "date fruit", loaned into Sanskrit as hintala. Some words retain both (c)iṟaku. It is an ongoing process in some Gondi languages which have sindi, hīndi, īndi.
3. Palatalization of k to c before non back vowels and if the following consonant isn't retroflex e.g. PD. *kewi, Ta. cevi "ear" but Ta. kēḷ "listen". Sometimes with alveolar consonants too PD. kila, kil-, kīṯ-, Ta. cila, kilukku, kīṟu. Exceptions: Tamil ceṭi, Toda kïḍf, Kannada giḍa, giḍu; Tamil ceḷimpu, kaḷimpu.
4. Loss of the laryngeal H e.g. PD. ∗puH, Ta. pū "flower", it survived into old Tamil in a few words as a restricted phoneme called Āytam. According to Tolkāppiyam in old Tamil it patterned with semivowels and it occurred after a short vowel and before a stop; it either lengthened the previous vowel, geminated the stop or was lost if the following segment is phonetically voiced in the environment.
5. The singular ṯ became a trill ṟ, doubled ṯṯ became ṟṟ [t:r] and ṉṯ became ṉṟ [ndr], e.g. PD. *cāṯu, Ta. āṟu "six". However in Sri Lankan Tamil dialects ṯṯ and ṉṯ are preserved in their original forms. For example, SLTa. paṟṟi "about" is pronounced [pat:i] and SLTa. paṉṟi "pig" is pronounced [pandi] (postnasal voicing of ṯ in ṉṯ).
6. Many of the ñ- became n- e.g. PD. *ñām Ta. nām "we (1SG plural inclusive)".
7. m and v alternates in some words e.g. māṉam ~ vāṉam. The word "dravidian" from Sanskrit drāviḍa is said to be from the word tamiḻ with the m becoming v.
8. Other alternating consonants are k~y, k~v, c~t, c~k, c~y, c~ḻ, cc~ṟṟ, mm~mp, y~ñ, r~ṟ, r~l, ḷ~ḻ, ḷ~l, ḷ~ṇ ṉ~ṇ, ṉ~l, eg. makaṉ ~ mavaṉ, Ta. pēcu ~ old Kn. pēḻu, cōṟṟi ~ cōcci, tummu ~ tumpu, yāḻ ~ ñāḻ, ilañci ~ iriñci, pavaḻam ~ pavaḷam, ūṅku ~ ūñcal, mutaḷai ~ mucali, naṇṇu ~ naḷḷu, eṇku ~ uḷiy-am ~ elu, nālku ~ nāṉku, aṇi ~ aṉpu.

=== Vowels ===
1. Neutralization of ā̆ and ē̆ after y, it also happens to a lesser extent with ñ- and c-.
2. In proto South-Dravidian, short i, u were lowered to e, o when it was followed by a short consonant and a short a, e.g. PD. *iṯaycci PSD. *eṯaycci; this change was reverted in Proto-Tamil where e, o were raised to i, u, e.g. PSD. *eṯaycci, Ta. iṟaicci; in colloquial Tamil this was again reverted where i, u gets lowered, LT. iṟaicci, ST. erecci (< eraicci).
3. Some V₁wV₂, V₁kV₂ and V₁yV₂ alternate with V̄₁ e.g. *tokal > tukal ~ tо̄l, *mical/*miyal > mēl, *peyar > peyar ~ pēr.

== Sample text ==
The following text is Article 1 of the Universal Declaration of Human Rights.

=== English ===
All human beings are born free and equal in dignity and rights. They are endowed with reason and conscience and should act towards one another in a spirit of brotherhood.

=== Tamil ===
மனிதப் பிறிவியினர் சகலரும் சுதந்திரமாகவே பிறக்கின்றனர்; அவர்கள் மதிப்பிலும், உரிமைகளிலும் சமமானவர்கள், அவர்கள் நியாயத்தையும் மனச்சாட்சியையும் இயற்பண்பாகப் பெற்றவர்கள். அவர்கள் ஒருவருடனொருவர் சகோதர உணர்வுப் பாங்கில் நடந்துகொள்ளல் வேண்டும்.

=== Romanisation (ISO 15919) ===
maṉitap piṟiviyiṉar cakalarum cutantiramākavē piṟakkiṉṟaṉar; avarkaḷ matippilum, urimaikaḷilum camamāṉavarkaḷ, avarkaḷ niyāyattaiyum maṉaccāṭciyaiyum iyaṟpaṇpākap peṟṟavarkaḷ. Avarkaḷ oruvaruṭaṉoruvar cakōtara uṇarvup pāṅkil naṭantukoḷḷal vēṇṭum.

=== IPA ===
/manit̪ap‿piriʋijinaɾ sakalaɾum sut̪ant̪iɾamaːkaʋeː pirakkinranaɾ ǀ aʋaɾkaɭ mat̪ippilum uɾimai̯kaɭilum samamaːnaʋaɾkaɭ aʋaɾkaɭ nijaːjat̪t̪ai̯jum manat͡ʃt͡ʃaːʈt͡ʃijum ijarpaɳpaːkap‿perraʋaɾkaɭ ǁ aʋaɾkaɭ oɾuʋaɾuʈanoɾuʋaɾ sakoːt̪aɾa uɳaɾʋup‿paːŋkil naʈant̪ukoɭɭal ʋeːɳʈum/

== See also ==
- IPA vowel chart with audio
- IPA pulmonic consonant chart with audio
- IPA chart (vowels and consonants) - 2015. (pdf file)

== Bibliography ==
- Keane, Elinor (2004), "Tamil", Journal of the International Phonetic Association, 34 (1), Oxford University Phonetics Laboratory: 111–116, doi:10.1017/S0025100304001549
- Krishnamurti, Bhadriraju (2003). The Dravidian Languages. Cambridge Language Surveys (1 ed.). Cambridge: Cambridge University Press. ISBN 978-0-521-77111-5.
- Iyengar, Arvind (2013). A Phonological Overview of the Hebbar Iyengar language. Australia: University of New England.
- Schiffman, Harold F. (1999). A Reference Grammar of Spoken Tamil. Cambridge Language Surveys (1 ed.). Cambridge: Cambridge University Press. ISBN 978-0521027526.
- Zvelebil, Kamil (1965). Some features of Ceylon Tamil. Indo-Iranian Journal. Vol. 9. JSTOR. pp. 113–138. JSTOR 24650188.
- Kuiper, F. B. J. (1962). Note on Old Tamil and Jaffna Tamil. Indo-Iranian Journal. Vol. 6. JSTOR. pp. 52–64. JSTOR 24646759.
- THANANJAYARAJASINGHAM, S.; BALASUBRAMANIAN, T. (1972). Some Observations on the Plosives in Colloquial Tamil as Spoken in Jaffna (Ceylon). Indo-Iranian Journal. Vol. 14. JSTOR. pp. 218–238. JSTOR 24651281.
- Susumu, Kuno (1958). PHONEMIC STRUCTURE OF COLLOQUIAL TAMIL.
- Rajam, V. S. (1992). A Reference Grammar of Classical Tamil Poetry (Thesis). Oxford University Phonetics Laboratory.
