= Brahmin Tamil =

Dialect of Tamil

Brahmin Tamil is the name of a dialect of Tamil traditionally spoken by Tamil Brahmins. The dialect, largely, uses Classical Tamil along with a heavy proportion of Sanskrit derivatives.

== History ==
During the early 1900s, Brahmin Tamil was used as the lingua-franca for inter-caste communication. The principal characters in the Tamil films of the period (1930s and 1940s) also spoke the Brahmin dialect. However, with the rise of the Pure Tamil Movement and the entry of Dravidian ideologues into Tamil cinema in the 1950s, Brahmin Tamil was gradually displaced from public spheres. Today, Brahmin Tamil is used in films and television soaps centred on the Brahmin society. Brahmin Tamil, has however, continued to flourish among the Brahmin community including the expatriates. Often non-Brahmins use this dialect in soaps and films for comic effect while engaging with Brahmins conversationally. And Brahmins effortlessly code switch by speaking the standard Tamil while engaging with non-Brahmins and revert to Brahmin Tamil when conversing among themselves.

The first systematic study of Brahmin Tamil was undertaken by Jules Bloch in 1910. However, the most detailed study was conducted by A K Ramanujan and William Bright in the 1960s. More recent research on Brahmin Tamil and other socio-dialects has been conducted by Kamil Zvelebil.

== Variations ==
There are many forms of Brahmin Tamil spoken. Brahmin Tamil, in general, is less influenced by regional dialects than the dialects used by other Tamil communities. The two main regional variations are the Thanjavur and Palakkad sub-dialects. Other sub-dialects include Ashtagrama Iyer Tamil, Mysore Vadama Iyer Tamil, Mandyam Tamil and Hebbar Tamil.

The differences between Thanjavur and Palakkad sub-dialects are:

1. In the words ending in m and n preceded by a vowel, the vowel is nasalised, but the nasal stops themselves are not pronounced except when followed by a word beginning with a vowel in the Thanjavur style. In the Palakkad style, the nasal stops in these cases are always pronounced.
2. The accent, style and vocabulary of Tamil used by Tamil Brahmins from Palakkad is greatly influenced by Malayalam apart from Sanskrit, while the sub-dialects used in Tamil Nadu borrow only from Sanskrit.

The Iyengars, particularly those outside Tamil Nadu, speak a dialect retaining ancient lexicon from religious texts such as the Naalayira Divya Prabandham.

== Differences with standard Tamil ==
=== Vocabulary ===
Brahmin Tamil varies slightly from standard Tamil. It retains minor adaptations of classical Tamil (Sentamil) words that are no longer in common usage. For instance, ām, a Brahmin Tamil word for "house", is derived from the classical Tamil word agam. It also notably incorporates a plethora of Sanskrit words. This may be observed in the etymology of several words in the Brahmin Tamil lexicon such as namaskaram (greeting), tirtham (water), and bhakshanam (food offering). There are also unique words in the dialect for signifying time, such as kartala to indicate morning. While non-Brahmin Tamils generally tend to use Sanskrit derivatives in their Prakrit form, Brahmins tend to use original Sanskrit. According to Bright and Ramanujan (1964),

It is the Brahmin dialect which has innovated by introducing the loan words. Brahmin Tamil frequently preserves non-native phonology, which non-Brahmin Tamil assimilates to native pattern

Differences with standard Tamil
Brahmin Tamil	Standard Tamil	English	Notes
Avāl, Avā	Avargal	they	Probably derived from 'Avarhal' where the r & h are silent. Alternatively derived from the Telugu word Vālu meaning "person"
Ivāl, Ivā	Ivargal	these people	
Ām/Aathu	Veedu	house	Derived from Old Tamil Agam (with the g pronounced more like silent 'h' -- 'a(h)am')
Tirtham, Jalam	Taṇṇīr	water	Thūtham is largely used in the Thanjavur sub-dialect and is derived from the Sanskrit Tīrtham. Iyengars, however, use the Sanskrit original.
Sittha	Konjam	some	Probably derived from Tamil Sattru meaning "a little."
Manni	Anni	elder brother's wife	Derived from "Maru-annai" meaning "another mom"
Athimbēr	Athai kozhunan	paternal aunt's husband/elder sister's husband	Derived from 'Ahathin Anbar'
Kshēmam/Sowkyam	Nalam	goodness (esp. with regard to health)	Derived from Sanskrit
Vāṅgō	Vāruṅgal (Literary), Vāṅga (Spoken)	Come	
Pōṅgō	Pōkuṅgal (Literary), Pōṅga (Spoken)	Go	
Aatukarar	Vītukkāran	Husband	Derived from Agam-udayān (house-holder)

The Ramanujan-Bright hypothesis which examined Brahmin Tamil in detail concluded -

In general, the Brahmin dialect seems to show great innovation on the more conscious levels of linguistic change – those of borrowing and semantic extension—while the non-Brahmin dialect shows greater innovation in less conscious type of change—those involving phonemic and morphological replacements

Bright attributes these changes to the comparatively high literacy rate of the Brahmin community.

A possible hypothesis is that literacy, most common among Brahmins has acted as a brake on change in their dialects-that the ‘frozen’ phonology and grammar of the literary language have served to retard change in Brahmin speech

Nicknames

There are also a few nicknames and sobriquets used in Brahmin Tamil alone.

Nickname	Source	Meaning	Usage
Ammānji	Name for mother's brother's child (a cousin)		
Pillaiyāndān	Pillai and Āndavan		Used to denote a dear child

=== Structure and pronunciation ===
As in standard spoken Tamil, the temporal verbal participles (as in -ccē/-sē from 'samayam' (time)) in Brahmin Tamil, have been borrowed from relative participle constructions on the model varaccē < varuxiṟa samayam ('while coming') and pōxasē < pōxiṟa samayam ('while going'). Brahmin Tamil also uses the retroflex approximant |ɻ| used in Old Tamil, but no longer in use in many non-Brahmin dialects.

== Usage ==
Though mainly used by Tamil Brahmins, the Brahmin dialect is also used occasionally, and to a lesser extent, by other forward caste Tamils such as Vellalars and Mudaliyars. Until the rise of Anti-Brahminism, the usage of Brahmin Tamil was favoured as the common Tamil dialect In the early decades of the 20th century, the Brahmin Tamil variant spoken in Madras city was considered to be standard spoken Tamil. However, since the 1950s and the gradual elimination of Sanskrit loan words from the spoken tongue, Brahmin Tamil has fallen into disuse and has been replaced by the Central and Madurai Tamil dialects, by non Brahmin communities, as the preferred spoken dialects for day-to-day use.

The Vaishnavite Iyengars having a unique subdialect of Brahmin Tamil of their own, called the Sri Vaishnava Manipravalam which interested linguistics for its peculiar grammatical forms and vocabulary. However, due to the development of a homogenised Brahmin identity during the medieval period, Vaishnavite Brahmins in the Tamil country have largely assimilated Brahmin Tamil with their own dialect, retaining several words of the Vaishnava Manipravalam in their vocabulary. The Hebbar and Mandyam Iyengars who reside outside the native Tamil land, however, continue to use Iyengar Tamil as their mother tongue. So do Ashtagrama Iyers and Mysore Vadama Iyers whose Tamil dialects while largely uses Brahmin Tamil has some Kannada influence. In contrast to peninsular India, the Brahmin dialect was never used by the Tamil Brahmins of Sri Lanka.

The difference between the Smartha and Sri Vaishnava variants are currently limited to vocabulary, particularly to words related to ritual and familial ties, alone.

Words unique to the Sri Vaishnava variant
Smartha Brahmin Variant	Sri Vaishnava Variant	English meaning
Rasam	Sattru amudu	Rasam. Literally means the stew that is used to mix with rice.
Chithappa	Chithiya	Father's younger brother (colloquial)
Abhishekham	Thirumanjanam	Bath of temple idols in a ceremonial way.
Payasam	Thirukanan amudhu	Sweet Porridge
Samayal	Thaligai	Cooking
Adukull	Thirumadapalli / Thaligai panra ull	Kitchen. Under Sri Vaishnava variant, the first one is to refer kitchen in temples, while the second one is used to refer kitchen in houses.
Kari	Kari amudhu	Vegetable Fry
kozhambu, sambar	Kozhambu	Liquid gravy, with dhal or even without dhal (for Sri Vaishnava variant only).
Narukurathu	Thirutharathu	To cut (generally vegetables)
Thootham/Jalam	Theertham	Water
Thayir Saadham	Dodhyonam	Curd rice
Thaalikkarathu	Thirupu maarapanrathu/Thirumaararthu	Tempering; the process of frying mustard, asafoetida in oil or ghee for aroma
Vendikarathu	Sevikkarathu	To worship
Kumbabhishekam	Samprokshanam	Consecration of a temple.
Namam pottukarathu	Thiruman ittukarathu	To apply one or three stroke Namam (Iyengar tilakam) on forehead
Ecchal idardhu	Ecchapiratal	Cleaning the left overs after having food

== See also ==
- Iyengar Tamil
- Tamil Brahmin
- Sankethi language
