= Sri Lankan Tamil (disambiguation) =

Sri Lankan Tamil may refer to:

- Sri Lankan Tamils, Tamil people native to Sri Lanka
  - Sri Lankan Tamil diaspora
- Sri Lankan Tamil dialects, a group of Tamil dialects used in Sri Lanka

== See also ==
- Indian Tamils of Sri Lanka
