= Batticaloa Tamil =

Batticaloa Tamil may refer to:

- Sri Lankan Tamils from Batticaloa in Sri Lanka
- Batticaloa Tamil dialect
