= Madras Bashai =

Dialect of Tamil

Madras Bashai (Tamil: மெட்ராஸ் பாஷை, lit. 'Madras Language') is a variety of the Tamil language spoken by native people in the city of Chennai (previously known as Madras) in the Indian state of Tamil Nadu. In the past it was sometimes considered a pidgin, as its vocabulary was heavily influenced by Hindustani, Indian English, Telugu, Malayalam, and Burmese; it is not mutually intelligible with any of those except for Tamil, to a certain extent.

Since the advent of urbanization of the city especially since the Indian Independence, due to large migrations into the city from different parts of Tamil Nadu, the Madras Bashai variety has become closer to normalized standard spoken Tamil. Today, the transformed variety is mainly referred to as Chennai Tamil.

Madras Bashai evolved largely during the past three centuries. It grew in parallel with the growth of cosmopolitan Madras. After Madras Bashai became somewhat common in Madras, it became a source of satire for early Tamil films from the 1950s, in the form of puns and double entendres. Subsequent generations in Chennai identified with it and absorbed English constructs into the dialect, making it what it is today's Chennai Tamil.

== Etymology ==
The word Madras Bashai is a compound term, where Madrās is derived from the classical name of the city Madrāsapaṭnam, and bhāṣā is the Sanskrit word for "language", nativized to bāṣai.

== Evolution ==
Madras Bashai evolved largely during the past three centuries. With its emergence as an important city in British India when they recovered it from the French and as the capital of Madras Presidency, the contact with western world increased and a number of English words crept into the vocabulary. Many of these words were introduced by educated, middle-class Tamil migrants to the city who borrowed freely from English for their daily usage. Due to the presence of a considerable population of Telugu, Hindi–Urdu and many other language-speakers, especially, the Gujaratis, Marwaris and some Muslim communities, some Hindustani and Telugu words, too, became a part of Madras Bashai. At the turn of the 20th century, though preferences have since shifted in favor of the Central and Madurai Tamil dialects, the English words introduced during the early 20th century have been retained.

Madras Bashai is generally considered a dialect of the working class like the Cockney dialect of English. Lyrics of gaana songs make heavy use of Madras Bashai.

== Vocabulary ==
A few words unique to Madras Bashai are given below; an Internet project, urban Tamil, has set out to collect urban Tamil vocabulary.

| Madras bashai | Standard Tamil | Meaning |
|---|---|---|
| Appāla (அப்பால) | piṟagŭ (பிறகு) | Afterwards |
| Annāṇḍa (அந்நாண்ட) | aṅkē (அங்கே) | There |
| Gānḍŭ (காண்டு) | kōpam (கோபம்) | Anger |
| Daulattu (தௌலத்து) | gettu, kauravam (கெத்து, கௌரவம்) | Respect, Honour |
| Gēttu (கேத்து) | āṇavam (ஆணவம்) | Swagger |
| Galaṭṭā (கலாட்டா) | kalavaram (கலவரம்) | Commotion |
| Iṭṭunu (இட்டுனு) | kūṭṭiṭṭu (கூட்டிட்டு) | Take (me along) |
| Mersal (மெர்சல்) | accam (அச்சம்), bhayam (பயம்) | Fear |
| Mokka/Mokkai (மொக்க/மொக்கை) | Nanṟāga Illai (நன்றாக இல்லை) | Lousy |
| Ḍabāykkiṟatŭ (டபாய்க்கிறது) | ēmāṟṟugiṟadŭ (ஏமாற்றுகிறது) | To fool |
| Kalāykkiṟatŭ (கலாய்க்கிறது) | kiṇḍal ceivadŭ (கிண்டல் செய்வது) | To tease |
| Gujjāllŭ (குஜ்ஜால்லு) | makiḻcci (மகிழ்ச்சி), santōṣam (சந்தோஷம்) | Happiness |
| Nikkarŭ (நிக்கரு) | kāl caṭṭai (கால் சட்டை) | Knickers |
| Sema (செம) | aṟputam (அற்புதம்) | Richness; colloquially, superb |
| Sōkkā irukītŭ (ஸோக்கா இருகீது ) | Nanṟāga irukkiṟatŭ (நன்றாக இருக்கிறது) | Looking sharp |

Words borrowed from other languages

| Madras bashai | Meaning | Source |
|---|---|---|
| Dubākkūr (டுபாக்கூர்) | Fraudster | From the English word dubash which, itself, is a derivative of the Hindusthani word "Do bhasha", usually, used to refer to interpreters and middlemen who worked for the British East India Company. As in the early 19th century, dubashes such as Avadhanum Paupiah were notorious for their corrupt practices, the term "dubash" gradually got to mean "fraud" |
| Nainā (நைனா) | Father | From the Telugu word Nāyanāh |
| Apīṭṭŭ (அபீட்டு) | To stop | From the English word, "abate" |
| Aṭṭŭ (அட்டு) | Worst | From the Burmese term အတု meaning 'worst' |
| Bēmānī (பேமானி) | Swearword; meaning shameless | Derived from the Urdu word bē imān meaning "a dishonest person" |
| Gabbŭ (கப்பு) | Stink | Derived from colloquial Telugu Gobbu |
| Gammŭ (கம்மு) | Silent | Derived from colloquial Telugu gommuni |
| Biskōttŭ (பிஸ்கோத்து) | Sub-standard | Derived from the English word "biscuit" |
| Ḍabbŭ (டப்பு) | Money | Derived from Telugu |
| Duḍḍŭ (துட்டு) | Money | Derived from Kannada |
| Galījŭ (கலீஜு) | Yucky | Derived from the Urdu word "Galeez", meaning dirty |
| Kasmālam (கஸ்மாலம்) | Dirty | Derived from the Sanskrit word "Kasmalam", meaning dirty, discardable |
| Bējāṟŭ (பேஜாறு) | Problem | Derived from Urdu, meaning displeased |
| Majā (மஜா) | Excitement or fun | Derived from the Urdu word "Maza" meaning "enthusiasm" |
| ōsi (ஓஸி) | Free-of-cost | From English. During the East India Company rule, letters posted on behalf of the East India Company did not bear postage stamps, but had the words 'On Company's Service' or 'OC' written on them. The word "O. C." gradually got to mean something which was offered free-of-cost |

== In film ==
Madras Bashai is used in many Tamil movies after the 1950s. Actors such, Manorama, J. P. Chandrababu, Loose Mohan, Thengai Srinivasan, Surulirajan, Janagaraj, Cho Ramaswamy, Rajinikanth, Kamal Haasan, Vijay Sethupathi, Dhanush, Suriya, Santhanam, Vikram, Attakathi Dinesh, Vijay and Ajith Kumar are well known for using it. Many screenwriters such as Crazy Mohan are known for frequently incorporating puns using the Madras Bashai into movie dialogue.

== See also ==
- Madrassi
- Tanglish
