= Tamil shorthand =

Shorthand format used in Tamil language

Tamil shorthand is the shorthand format used in Tamil Language. This was invented by Srinivasa Rao and was adopted since 1894.

Another contributor to Tamil shorthand was N. Subramania Iyer, the founder president of The Stenographers' Guild during the years 1935. Both the methods are recognised by the Government of Madras, currently Government of Tamil Nadu for official use.
