= Madrasi Para =

Neighborhood in Karachi, Pakistan

Coordinates: 24°51′40″N 67°01′41″E

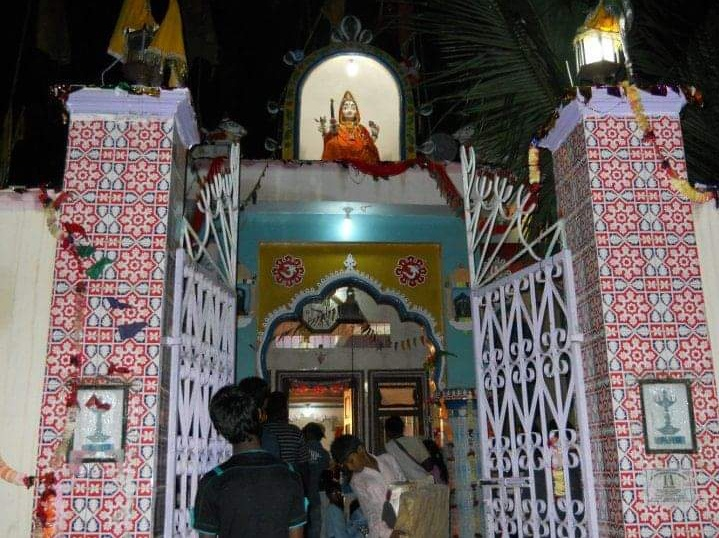
Mariamman temple in JPMC karachi

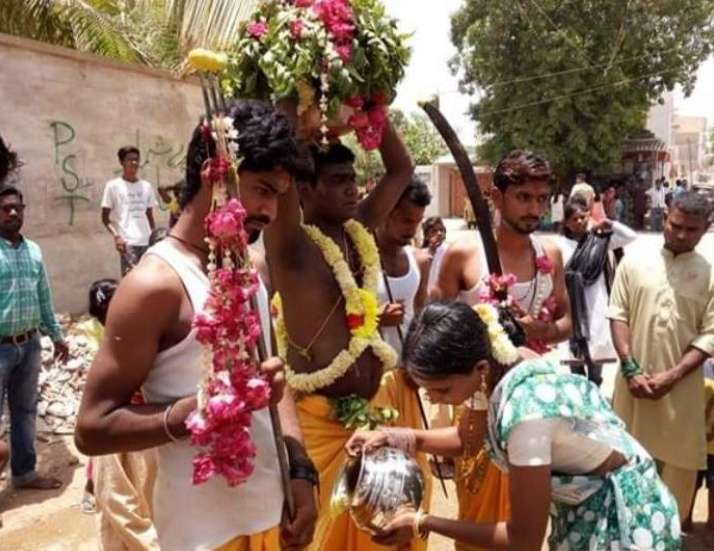
Tamil Hindus celebrating festival in JPMC karachi

Madrasi Para (Urdu: مدراسی پاڑہ; Tamil: மதராசி பாடா) is a neighborhood in the Karachi Cantonment area of Karachi, Sindh, Pakistan. This neighborhood is located close to the Jinnah Post Graduate Medical Centre. The population of this neighborhood is mostly Tamil Hindus that migrated in early 20th century before the independence of Pakistan when Karachi was developed during the British Raj. The Mariamman Temple located in this neighborhood is a Tamil Hindu temple in Karachi.

Madrasi Para is known for preserving South Indian cultural traditions, including cuisine. The dosa, a thin pancake made from a fermented batter of lentils and rice, is a popular dish originating from South India and is served at a few food stalls in Karachi. The dosa, which sells for around Rs500 ($3), is prepared through a meticulous process that takes approximately three days, including fermentation.

The neighborhood is home to a few hundred migrants, many of whom still reside in the area, including Hindus, Christians, and Muslims who have integrated with the Urdu-speaking migrant communities. Although speaking South Indian languages has become less common, the community continues to unite through shared culinary traditions. Dishes such as dosa and idli remain an integral part of their cuisine and are available in Karachi’s food centers.

== See also ==
- Tamils in Pakistan
