= Jaffna Tamil =

Jaffna Tamil may refer to:

- Jaffna Tamil dialect, native to the Jaffna Peninsula, Sri Lanka
- Jaffna Tamils, members of the Tamil ethnic group native to Sri Lanka
