= Iyengar Tamil =

Dialect of Tamil

- Region: Primarily Tamil Nadu and Karnataka
- Native speakers: Unknown (The Iyengar community employs the dialect in tandem with standard Tamil)
- Language family: Dravidian: Southern; Southern I; Tamil–Kannada; Tamil–Kota; Tamil–Toda; Tamil–Irula; Tamil–Kodava–Urali; Tamil–Malayalam; Tamiloid; Tamil–Paliyan; Tamil; Iyengar Tamil
- Early forms: Old Tamil: Middle Tamil

Language codes
- ISO 639-3: –
- Glottolog: aiya1239

Iyengar Tamil (Tamil: ஐயங்கார் தமிழ்) is a dialect of the Tamil language spoken mostly in Tamil Nadu and Karnataka, as well as other neighbouring regions of South India. It is spoken by the Iyengar community, a sect of Tamil Brahmins whose members adhere to Sri Vaishnavism. Iyengars are present in considerable numbers in the states of Tamil Nadu, Karnataka, and Andhra Pradesh, though their spoken dialect varies from state to state.

== Development ==
During the ancient period, Brahmin Tamil was spoken only by those Brahmins who were associated with the Smartha tradition, including the Iyers. The Iyengars developed a unique dialect of their own over the centuries, called the Sri Vaishnava Manipravalam. Owing to the development of a homogenised Brahmin identity during the medieval period, the Vaishnavite Brahmins of Tamilakam largely assimilated Brahmin Tamil with their own dialect, retaining several words of the Vaishnava Manipravalam in their lexicon. The Hebbar and Mandyam Iyengars who reside outside the Tamil country, however, continue to use Iyengar Tamil as their mother tongue.

== Characteristics ==
A unique characteristic of Iyengar Tamil is its retention of a lexicon associated with sacredness, with its roots usually from Sanskrit. For example, Iyengar Tamil makes distinctions between potable water (tīrtham) and non-potable water (jalam), with the former bearing a sacred connotation. The Tamil vernacular, in comparison, employs the terms tanīr or tannī to refer to potable water. Similarly, Iyengars employ the term bhakshanam to refer to religious offerings of food, which is otherwise absent in standard Tamil.

In terms of grammar, enquiries in Iyengar Tamil often involve substitutions in the suffixes present in the vernacular, namely with élā and ōnō. For instance, an Iyengar would be likely to ask "sāptélā?" or "sāptéōnō?" rather than the Tamil colloquial "sāpténglā?", or the formal "sāptīrgàlā?" to enquire, "Have you eaten?" to someone. Iyengar Tamil also possesses the vowel substitution of "a" with "ō" at the end of words when it comes to directives. For instance, an Iyengar would be likely to say "pōngō" rather than the colloquial "pōngà" to direct someone to go.

For a more comprehensive list of the variations between standard Tamil and Iyengar Tamil, refer to Brahmin Tamil.
