= Pakistani Tamils =

Dravidian ethnolinguistic group in Pakistan

Total population
- 5,000-10,000 (2011 census)

Regions with significant populations
- Sindh; Balochistan

Languages
- Tamil (Arwi); Sindhi; Hindustani (Urdu); Balochi

Religion
- Islam; Hinduism; Sikhism; Christianity

Related ethnic groups
- Brahui people; Tamil Muslims; Telugu Muslims; Dravidian diaspora

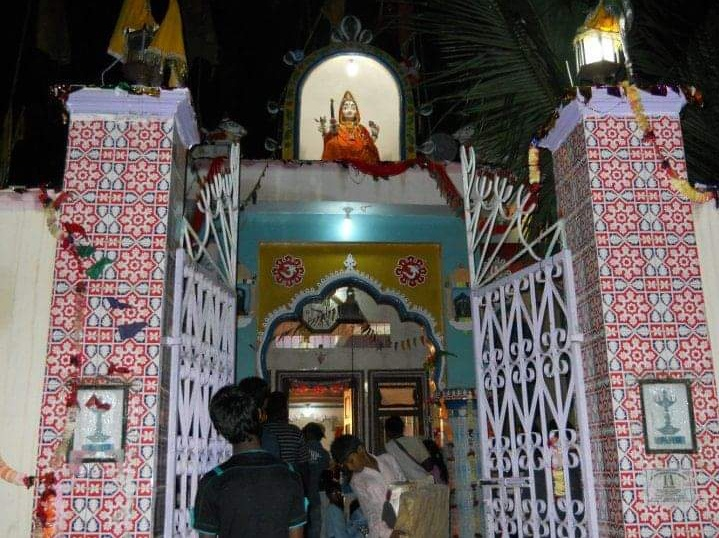
Mariamman temple in JPMC, Karachi

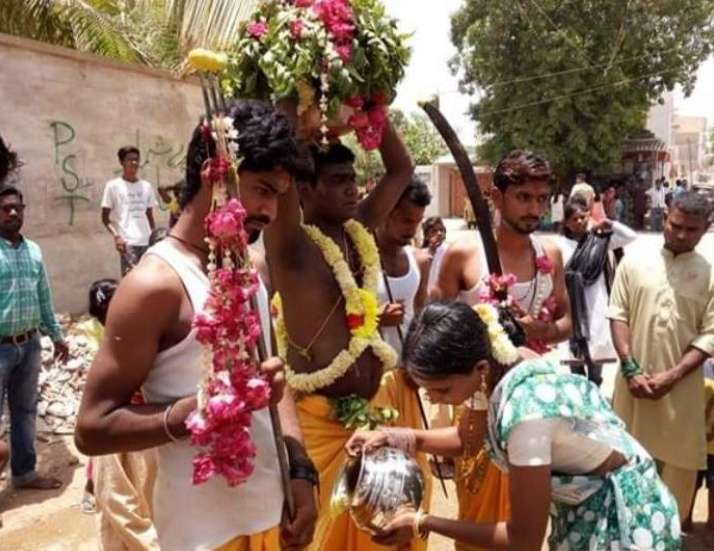
Tamil Hindus celebrating festival in JPMC, Karachi

There is a small community of Tamils in Pakistan. Some Tamils migrated from the South Indian state of Tamil Nadu, and settled in Karachi after independence in 1947, although there are some Tamils that have been there since the early 20th century, when Karachi developed during the British Raj. There are Sri Lankan Tamils that arrived during the Sri Lankan Civil War who are mostly Hindus. The Madrasi Para area behind the Jinnah Post Graduate Medical Centre is home to 100 Tamil Hindu families. The population of Tamils in Pakistan is over 5000. The Shri Rama Pir Mandir Temple was located in this neighborhood but was demolished by a builder. The temple was the biggest Tamil Hindu temple in Karachi. In addition, Drigh Road and Korangi also have a Tamil population. Mariamman temple at Soldier Bazaar, Karachi managed by Pakistan Madras Hindu Panchayat was also demolished in July 2023. Tamil cuisine is still alive there. Till August 2019, Pakistan receives 30 post office mails from Tamil Nadu every month.

== Notable people ==
- Subrahmanyan Chandrasekhar, Indian-American Nobel laureate born in pre-independence Lahore
- Mani Shankar Aiyar, Indian diplomat and politician born in Lahore; served as Indian consul-general in Karachi from 1978 to 1982
- Victor Gnanapragasam, Catholic bishop
