= Sri Lankan Tamil dialects =

Group of dialects of Tamil

Sri Lankan Tamil
- Native to: Sri Lanka
- Ethnicity: Sri Lankan Tamils
- Native speakers: 2 million (2012 census)
- Language family: Dravidian: Southern; Southern I; Tamil–Kannada; Tamil–Kota; Tamil–Toda; Tamil–Irula; Tamil–Kodava–Urali; Tamil–Malayalam; Tamiloid; Tamil–Paliyan; Tamil; Sri Lankan Tamil
- Early forms: Old Tamil: Middle Tamil
- Dialects: Jaffna; Batticaloa; Negombo
- Writing system: Tamil script, Vatteluttu

Language codes
- ISO 639-3: –
- Glottolog: sril1244

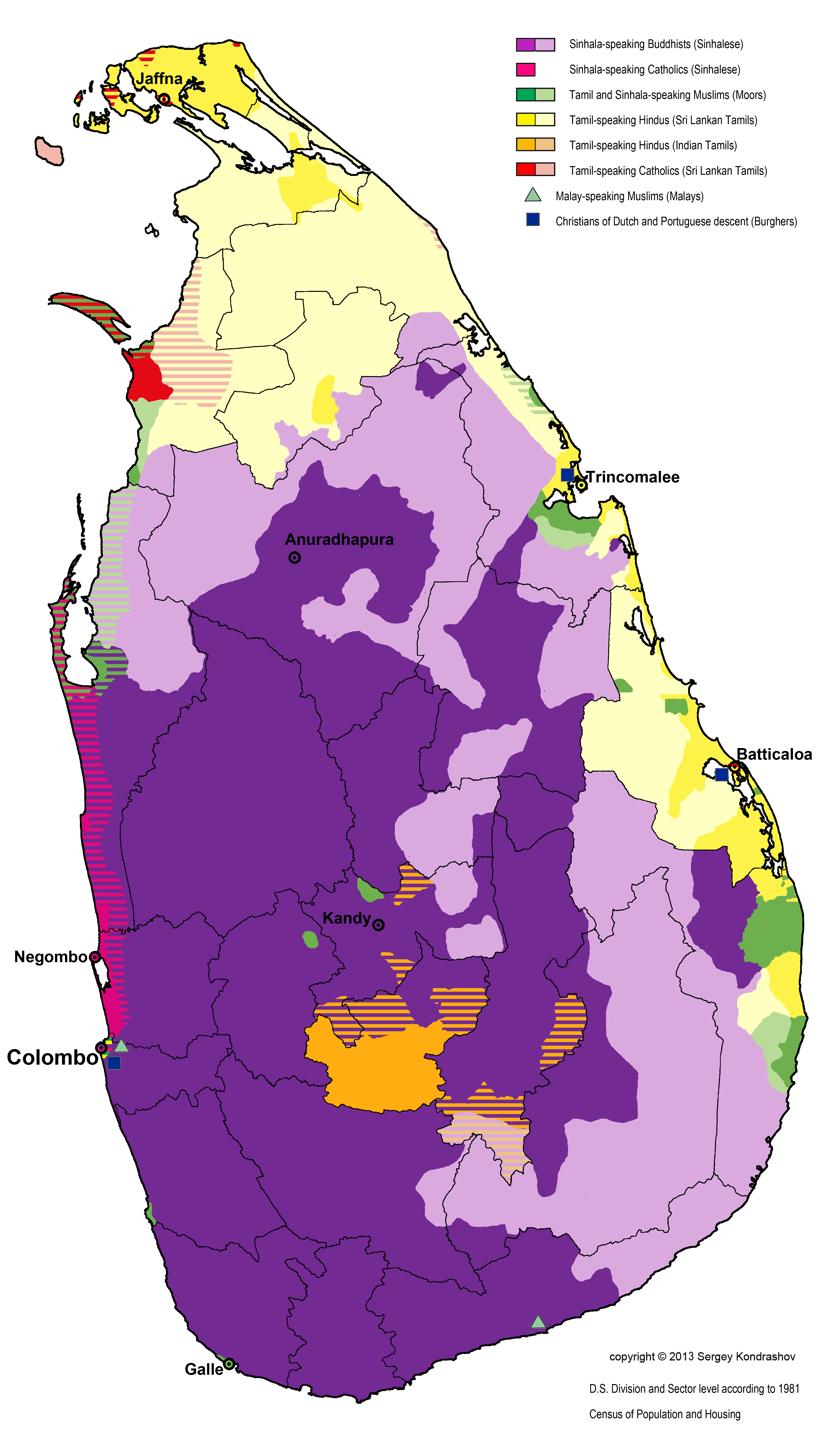
Distribution of languages and religious groups of Sri Lanka on D.S. division and sector level according to the 1981 Census of Population and Housing

The Sri Lankan Tamil dialects or Ceylon Tamil (Tamil: ஈழத் தமிழ், īḻat tamiḻ) are a group of Tamil dialects used in Sri Lanka by its native Tamil speakers that are distinct from the Tamil dialects spoken in Tamil Nadu. These dialects are more conservative than the dialects spoken in India, and preserve features of Old and Medieval Tamil which have been lost in their Indian counterparts. (Note: "Greater continuity may be observed between Old Tamil and modern Sri Lankan Tamil than between the old language and the modern mainland dialects spoken in India. Sri Lankan Tamil preserves the medial deitic series in u-, as in u-vaṉ ‘man in between’, and the synthetic present perfect in -aṉ-, as in coṉ.ṉ-āṉ-āṉ ‘I have said’. The mainland dialects have lost these forms. Modern Sri Lankan Tamil has also resisted the borrowing of contrastive voiced stops in the spoken register: mainland dōcai ‘rice pancake’ corresponds to Sri Lankan tōcai ‘id.’.") In spite of this, both Sri Lankan and Indian Tamil dialects retain a degree of mutual intelligibility.

Sri Lankan Tamil dialects are broadly categorized into three sub groups: Jaffna Tamil, Batticaloa Tamil, and Negombo Tamil dialects. But there are a number of sub dialects within these broad regional dialects as well. These dialects are also used by ethnic groups other than Tamils and Muslims such as Sinhalese people, Portuguese Burghers and the indigenous Coastal Vedda people.

== Characteristics ==
As Tamil is a diglossic language, the differences between the standard written languages across the globe is minimal but the spoken varieties differ considerably. The spoken Tamil varieties in Sri Lanka although different from those of Tamil Nadu in India share some common features with the southern dialects of Tamil Nadu. Sri Lankan Tamil dialects retain many words and grammatical forms that are not in everyday use in Tamil Nadu, and use many other words slightly differently. In general, Sri Lankan Tamil dialects are considered to be more conservative than the continental Tamil dialects.

== Dialects ==
=== Jaffna Tamil ===
The dialect used in Jaffna preserves many features of Old Tamil that predate Tolkāppiyam, the earliest grammatical treatise of Tamil. For example, Jaffna Tamil preserves the three way deictic distinction (ivan, uvan, avan, corresponding to proximal, medial and distal respectively), whereas all other Tamil dialects have eliminated the medial form. The Jaffna Tamil dialect also retains many words which were used in Sangam literature such as Tirukkuṛaḷ and Kuṟuntokai. There are a number of Prakrit loans words that are unique to Jaffna Tamil. A subdialect retained by the Paraiyar people of Kayts still retains a number of archaic words and Prakrit loans not found in any other dialects of Tamil. These drummers had historically played an important role as ritual players of drums at funerals and folk temples and as heralds and traditional weavers. They also maintained the family records of their feudal lords and even practised medicine and astrology in folk traditions

=== Batticaloa Tamil ===
Batticaloa Tamil dialect is shared between Tamils, Moors, Veddhas and Portuguese Burghers in the eastern province. The Tamil dialect used by residents of the Trincomalee district has many similarities with the Jaffna Tamil dialect. According to Kamil Zvelebil a linguist, the Batticaloa Tamil dialect is the most literary like of all spoken dialects of Tamil, and it has preserved several very antique features, and has remained more true to the literary norm than any other form of Tamil while developing a few striking innovations. Although Batticaloa Tamil has some very specific features of vocabulary, it is classified with other Sri Lankan Tamil dialects as it is related to them by characteristic traits of its phonology. It also maintains some words that are unique to present day .

=== Negombo Tamil ===
The Negombo Tamil dialect, used in the Negombo area by bilingual fishers who otherwise identify themselves as Sinhalese, has undergone considerable morphosyntactic convergence with spoken or colloquial Sinhala as a consequence of contact with it. It has also developed a number of other grammatical traits under the probable influence of Sinhala, including a postposed indefinite article, an indefinitizing postclitic –sari (apparently modeled on Sinhala –hari), and case assignments for defective verbs that follow the Sinhala, rather than Tamil, patterns of agreement.

== See also ==
- Indian Tamil dialect of Sri Lanka
- Sri Lankan Muslim Tamil
- Tamil loanwords in Sinhala
- Loan words in Sri Lankan Tamil

== Cited literature ==
- Indrapala, Karthigesu (2007). The evolution of an ethnic identity: The Tamils in Sri Lanka C. 300 BCE to C. 1200 CE. Colombo: Vijitha Yapa. ISBN 978-955-1266-72-1.
- Lehmann, Thomas (1998). Steever, Sanford B. (ed.). The Dravidian Languages. Routledge. ISBN 978-04-15-41267-4.
- Subramaniam, Suganthy (2006). Folk Traditions and Songs of Batticaloa District. Kumaran Publishing. p. 99. ISBN 0-9549440-5-4.
