= Central Tamil dialect =

Dialect of Tamil

The Central Tamil dialect is a dialect of Tamil spoken in the districts of Thanjavur, Tiruvarur, Nagapattinam, Mayiladuthurai, Perambalur and Tiruchirapalli in central Tamil Nadu, India and to some extent, in the neighbouring Cuddalore and Pudukkottai districts. Along with Madurai Tamil, the Central Tamil dialect is considered to be one of the purest forms of spoken Tamil in Tamil Nadu and is considered to be the basis of standard spoken Tamil in the state.
