= Jaffna Tamil dialect =

Dialect of Tamil

Jaffna Tamil
- யாழ்ப்பாணத் தமிழ்
- Native to: Northern Province, Sri Lanka
- Region: Jaffna
- Ethnicity: Sri Lankan Tamils
- Native speakers: 2 million (2012 census)
- Language family: Dravidian: Southern; Southern I; Tamil–Kannada; Tamil–Kota; Tamil–Toda; Tamil–Irula; Tamil–Kodava–Urali; Tamil–Malayalam; Tamiloid; Tamil–Paliyan; Tamil; Sri Lankan; Jaffna Tamil
- Early forms: Old Tamil: Middle Tamil
- Writing system: Tamil script, Vatteluttu

Language codes
- ISO 639-3: –

The Jaffna Tamil dialect is a Tamil dialect native to the Jaffna Peninsula and is the primary dialect used in Northern Sri Lanka and Northern parts of Trincomalee District. It preserves many antique features of Old Tamil that predate Tolkāppiyam, the earliest grammatical treatise of Tamil. The Jaffna Tamil dialect also retains many forms of words and phonemes which were used in Sangam literature such as Tirukkuṛaḷ and Kuṟuntokai, which has gone out of vogue in most Indian Tamil dialects.

The Jaffna Tamil dialect is a Tamil language subgroup dialect native to the Jaffna Peninsula and is the primary dialect used in Northern Sri Lanka. The Jaffna Tamil dialect has a very similar intonation (tone) to Malayalam.

Consequently, many consider the Jaffna dialect to be a more conservative form of Tamil. Although audibly quite distinct from the spoken Tamil dialects of Tamil Nadu, it nevertheless shares a similar standard written Tamil as Tamil Nadu, but is not always mutually intelligible in colloquial forms. Similarly, Sri Lankan Tamil dialects are not mutually intelligible with Malayalam too though it has a similar intonation and some words which stem from Old Tamil are shared.

A subdialect retained by the Paraiyar people of Kayts still retains a number of archaic words and Prakrit loans not found in any other dialects of Tamil. These drummers had historically played an important role as ritual players of drums at funerals and folk temples and as heralds and traditional weavers. They also maintained the family records of their feudal lords and even practised medicine and astrology in folk traditions

== History ==
The Jaffna district is very close to South India, being separated by a narrow stretch of sea called the Palk Strait. In spite of the continual contact with India by sea, Sri Lankan Tamils have over the centuries become a distinct people developing dialects that differ in several aspects from the Indian Tamil dialects. The Jaffna Tamil dialect is also distinct to a lesser extent from that of the Eastern, Western and Upcountry Tamil dialects of Sri Lanka.

== Pronunciation ==
Devoicing of [h] occurs in the Jaffna dialect, the voiceless plosives of the Jaffna dialects represent an antique feature of the pre-Sangam period. The Jaffna pronunciation [nitka]>[nikka] for nirka “to stand’ is likely to preserve the ancient plosive nature of /r/, which in colloquial middle Tamil inscriptions is already confounded with the dental trill in this position.

== See also ==
- Sri Lankan Tamil dialects
- Batticaloa Tamil dialect
- Negombo Tamil dialect
