= Mampuri =

Coordinates: 8°00′N 79°44′E

Mampuri is a small village situated within the Puttalam peninsula in the Puttalam District in Sri Lanka. It has transformed since the 1990s from a largely farming and seasonal fishing settlement into a fishing dominant village. Its population includes Sinhalese, Sri Lankan Tamils and Sri Lankan Muslims.
