= Madurai Tamil =

Dialect of Tamil

Madurai Tamil is the dialect of Tamil language spoken in Madurai and the surrounding regions in southern Tamil Nadu, the area once ruled by the Pandya dynasty. It is widely spoken in the districts of Madurai, Theni, Virudunagar, Dindigul, Ramanathapuram, and Sivaganga. It differs from Nellai Tamil spoken in the southeastern part of the state.

== Select dictionary of words ==
- Marutha (மறுத) = Madurai
- varainga (வராய்ங்க) = They're coming
- porainga (போராய்ங்க) = They're going
- angittu (அங்கிட்டு) = There
- ingittu (இங்கிட்டு) = Here
- embuttu (எம்புட்டு) = How much?
- ravuran (ராவுறான்) = He is boring
- vyekyanama pesu (வீயாக்கானமா பேசு) = Speak properly
- kundaka mandaka (குண்டக்க மண்டக்க) = Irrelevant
- kalapa (கலப்ப) = Plough
- patraya podu (பட்றைய போடு) = Sit and relax
- kokka makka (கொக்க மக்க) = Collective term for cousin
- kolara poitu va (கோலாரா போயிட்டு வா) = Take care
- posaketta paya (பொசகட்ட பய) = Useless fellow
- seemennai (சீமை எண்ணை = சீம்மண்ணை) = Kerosene
- imbutukandi (இம்புட்டுகூண்டு) = Very little
- roota kodukatha (ரூட்ட குடுக்காத) = Don't tell lies
- vaiya porainga (வைய்யபோறாய்ங்க) = They are going to scold
- Paelatha (பேலாத) = Don't fear
- athukaandithaan (அதுகாண்டிதான்) = Only for that
- ithukaandithaan (இதுகாண்டிதான்) = Only for this
- kudikaramattai (குடிக்காரமட்டை) = Drunkard
- jaari (ஜாரி) = Beautiful woman
- aataya podu (ஆட்டைய போடு) = Steal, thieve
- yenney (அண்ணே) = Elder brother
- yekkah (எக்கோய்) = Elder sister
- podangoiyala (போடா ங்கொய்யால) = Get out of my way
- dubuku (டுபுக்கு) = Fool (which is derived from kanniyakumari)
- manda kanam (மண்டகனம்) = Headweight
- soliya paaru (சோலிய பாரு) = Mind your own business
- lanthu (லந்து) = Kidding
- kaapraa (காப்ரா) = Fashionable
- alaparai (அலப்பறை) = Fashionable
- alumbu (அலும்பு) = Showy, showing pride
- yelraya kootadha (ஏழரைய கூ்ட்டாத) = Don't create a scene
- aatum (ஆட்டும்) = Okay
- soodhanama iru (சூதானமா இரு) = Be careful
- konga paya (கொங்க பய) = Slang word for Kongu Tamil speakers
- Kaavali (காவாளி) = Waste fellow
- Kalavaanee (களவாணி) = Thief
- Vellaney (வெள்ளனே) = Early morning
- Paiyya (பைய) = Slow
- Osakka (ஒசக்க) = Up
- Seanthi = Loft
- Yeni maram (ஏணி மரம்) = Ladder
