= Batticaloa Tamil dialect =

Dialect of Tamil

Batticaloa Tamil dialect is shared between Tamils, Moors, Veddhas and Portuguese Burghers in the Batticaloa-Amparai region of the Eastern Province, Sri Lanka. The Tamil dialect used by residents of the Trincomalee District has many similarities with the Jaffna Tamil dialect. According to Kamil Zvelebil a linguist, the Batticaloa Tamil dialect is the most literary like of all spoken dialects of Tamil, and it has preserved several antique features, and has remained more true to the literary norm than any other form of Tamil while developing a few striking innovations. Although Batticaloa Tamil has some very specific features of vocabulary, it is classified with other Sri Lankan Tamil dialects as it is related to them by characteristic traits of its phonology. It also maintains some words that are unique to present day. Also, the dialect has less influence of Sanskrit.
