= Negombo Tamil dialect =

Dialect of Tamil

Negombo Tamil or Negombo Fishermen's Tamil is a Sri Lankan Tamil dialect used by the fishers of Negombo, Sri Lanka. This is just one of the many dialects used by the remnant population of formerly Tamil-speaking people of the western Puttalam District and Gampaha District of Sri Lanka. Those who still identify them as ethnic Tamils are known as Negombo Tamils or as Puttalam Tamils. Although most residents of these districts identify them as ethnic Sinhalese some are bilingual in both the languages.

== Morphology ==
The specific dialect known as Negombo Fisherman's Tamil (NFT) spoken by the Karava or Karaiyar caste fishers of Negombo. NFT has many distinctive traits, some of which may have arisen as a consequence of contact with Sinhala. It is also proposed that it may have undergone considerable morphosyntactic convergence with spoken or colloquial Sinhala (CS), as a consequence of contact with it.

For example, NFT has mostly lost Tamil verb agreement morphology for person and number. Colloquial Sinhala (unlike Literary Sinhala) has a single verb form for all persons, singular and plural. Most Tamil dialects, by contrast, retain in both the spoken and the written languages a well-developed system of person and number verb agreement morphology. Thus in NFT we have, with Jaffna Tamil dialect (JT) which a major dialect of the Sri Lankan Tamils ethnic group for comparison:

- a. naan kolumbu-kki poo-ra (NFT)

    I    Colombo     go (I go to Colombo)

- b. naan kolumbu-kku poo-r-een (JT)

    I    Colombo     going (I am going to Colombo)

- c. mamə koləmbə-Tə yanəwa (CS)

   I    Colombo      go (I go to Colombo)

NFT has also developed a number of other grammatical traits under the probable influence of Sinhala, including a postposed indefinite article, an indefinitizing postclitic –sari (apparently modeled on Sinhala –hari), and case assignments for defective verbs that follow the Sinhala, rather than Tamil, patterns of agreement.

== Unique dialect ==
NFT probably originated in India, but has subsequently adopted, and is still adopting, Sri Lankan Tamil traits. The dialect is spoken by perhaps as many as 50,000 people, is thus a very distinctive dialect. With Karnataka based Saraswat Konkani (Nadkarni 1975), Tamil Nadu based Saurashtri (Smith 1978), Sri Lankan Creole Portuguese and the Urdu, Marathi, and Kannada dialects of Kupwar (Gumperz and Wilson 1971), NFT grammar is the outcome of pervasive structural realignment as a result of stable bilingualism.

Negombo Tamil is the fact that the Karavas immigrated to Sri Lanka much later than Tamils immigrated to Jaffna. This would suggest that the Negombo dialect continued to evolve in the Coromandel Coast before it arrived in Sri Lanka and began to get influenced by Sinhala. So, in some ways, the dialect is closer to those spoken in Tamil Nadu than is Jaffna Tamil.
