= Vibrant consonant =

Class of consonant sounds

In phonetics, a vibrant is a class of consonant including taps and trills (a trill is "sometimes referred to as a vibrant consonant"). Spanish has two vibrants, /r/ and /ɾ/.

The term is sometimes used when it is not clear whether the rhotic (r-sound) in a language is a tap or a trill.

== See also ==
- Lateral consonant
- Liquid consonant
