= Indian Tamil dialect of Sri Lanka =

Dialect of Tamil

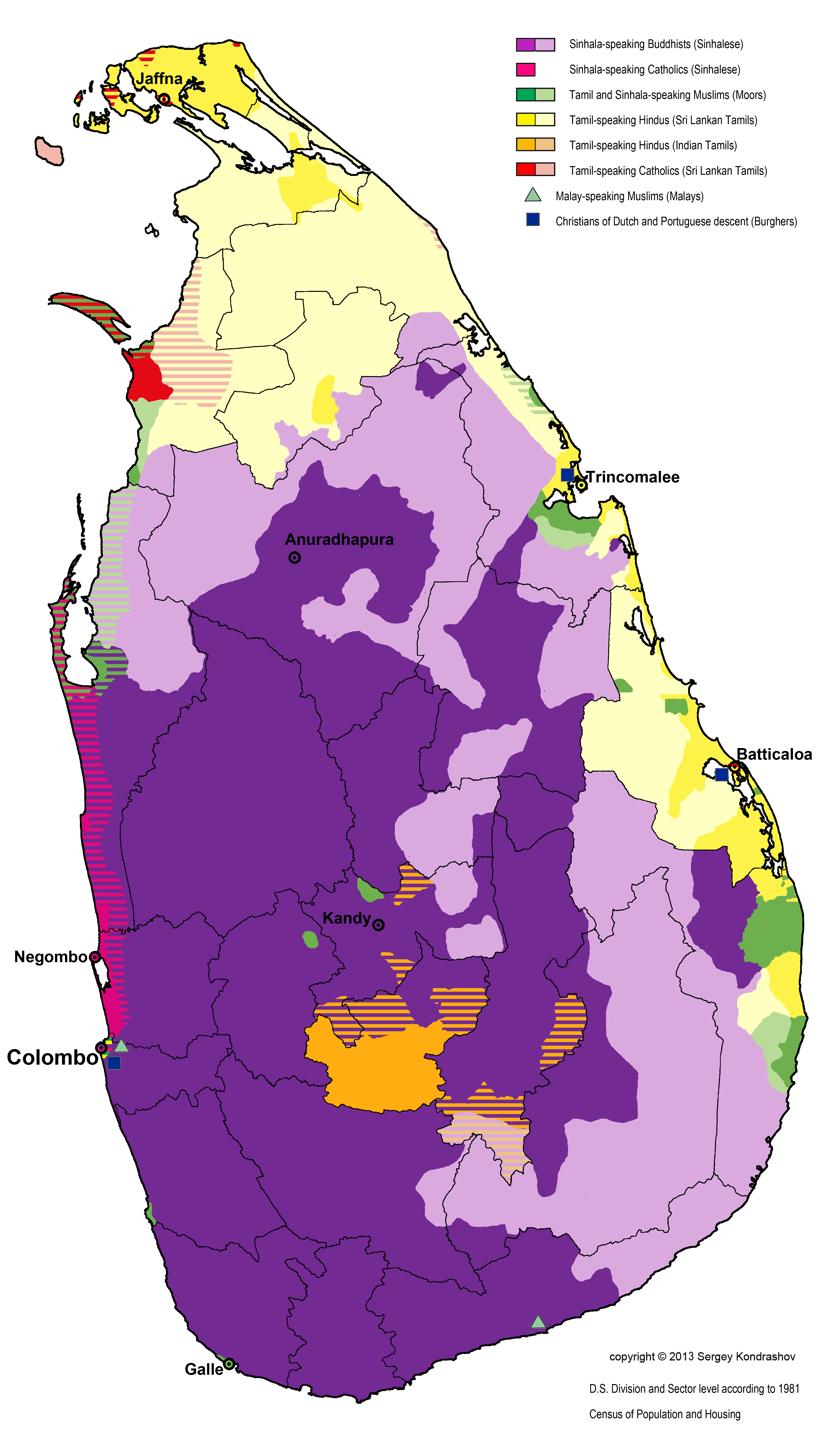
Distribution of languages and religious groups of Sri Lanka on D.S. division and sector level according to the 1981 Census of Population and Housing, Indian Tamil dialect of Sri Lanka is primarily used in the central highlands of the country

Indian Tamil dialect of Sri Lanka or Upcountry Tamil dialect or Estate Tamil (ET) is a Tamil dialect spoken by the descendants of indentured South Indian labourers who were brought to Sri Lanka during British colonization and South Indians who migrated to Sri Lanka for better prospects. ET is often misunderstood as Indian Tamil as the people who speak this dialect can trace their ancestry back to South India but much research has not been done regarding this dialect due to the misunderstanding that there is absolutely no difference between ET and Indian Tamil. However research shows that ET is a dialect that heavily differs from Indian Tamil for multiple reasons.

The ancestors of ET speakers migrated from different parts of South India and they spoke different dialects of Tamil. For example, grandmother for Pallar community was “attay” while for Kudiyar it was “ammay”. In the last century these different dialects of Indian Tamil co-existed in close proximity in the hill country and it evolved into what is currently known as Estate Tamil. Moreover there are dialectal differences within ET due to different types of language contact. Language contact between the different dialects of Indian Tamil and Sinhala after Sinhala labourers also started working in tea and rubber plantations had a considerable impact in the development of ET as a separate dialect from Indian Tamil.

The geographical distance between the two dialects of Tamil, ET and Indian Tamil has also impacted the evolution of ET as a separate dialect. ET has been in Sri Lanka for over a century and as mentioned above has come into contact with a different language Sinhala. Moreover, ET has been exposed to different dialects of Tamil within Sri Lanka such as Jaffna Tamil which has also caused changes in ET. This shows that ET is indeed different from Indian Tamil.

There are phonological differences between the two dialects. Out of the consonants /b/d /D/ /j /g/ are voiced stops in Indian Tamil while in ET they occasionally occur as voiceless stops in loan words. For example, ‘bayam’ (fear) in Indian Tamil is “payam” in ET. Studies have identified that there are three distinctive nasals in Indian Tamil but the phonemic differences of these nasals are slowly fading away in ET. For example maɳam (smell) in Indian Tamil is manam in ET. ‘ɳ’ in ET occurs only in loan words or preceding /c/ and /ɳ/ in Indian Tamil is realized as /n/ in ET. For example ‘koɳjam’ (a little) in Indian Tamil is ‘koɳcam’ in ET. Morphological differences can be found between Indian Tamil and ET as well. In Indian Tamil, /ooDa/ /uDaya/ and /kka/ are genitive case markers but in ET these case markers have slights variations such as /ooDa/ is /ooTa/ in ET, /uDaya/ is /uTaya/, /uTTu/ and /atu/ in ET.

Thus, it is clear that ET is a different dialect from Indian Tamil as the different dialects of Indian Tamil that evolved into ET due to close proximity with each other and language and dialectal contact between ET, Sinhala and other dialects of Sri Lankan Tamil.
