= Virupakshi Hill Banana =

Banana cultivar from the Western Ghats, India

- Geographical indication
- Description: Bananas from Virupakshi region
- Type: Agricultural
- Area: Virupakshi, Dindigul district, Tamil Nadu
- Country: India
- Registered: 2008–09

Virupakshi Hill Banana is a type of banana grown in the Virupakshi region in the Palani Hills of Western Ghats in the Indian state of Tamil Nadu. It was declared as a Geographical indication in 2008–09.

== Description ==
The banana is cultivated at higher altitudes along the Palani Hills in the Western Ghats. It is often grown as a rain-fed crop grown during the South-west monsoon season. In the 1990s, cultivation areas were reduced by more than 90% as the crop was severely affected by Banana bunchy top virus. With various steps taken to alleviate the same, cultivation has expanded in the past decade.

Each tree bears a bunch of 70-100 fruits, which are first harvested after 18 months. The fruits are yellowish-green in color and is known for its unique smell and sweetness. The ripe fruits are firm with a thicker peel. The fruit is one of the five ingredients used in the Palani Panchamirtham, a unique panchamrita, made at the Dhandayuthapani Swamy Temple in Palani.
