= Palani Panchamirtham =

Indian sweet recipe and Temple offering

- Geographical indication
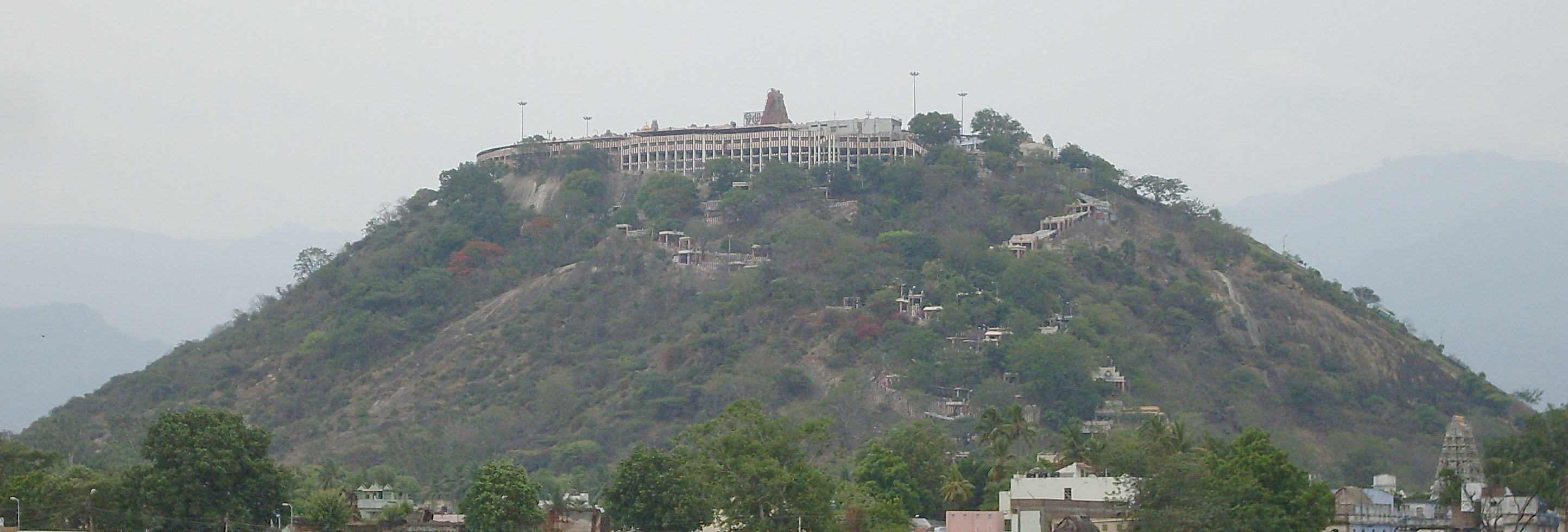
- Dhandayuthapani Swamy Temple atop the Palani Hills
- Description: Panchamrita from Palani region
- Type: Foodstuff
- Area: Palani, Dindigul district, Tamil Nadu
- Country: India
- Registered: 2019–20

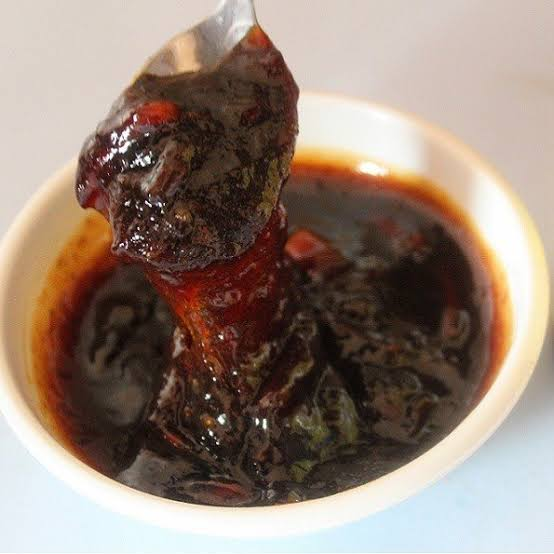
Palani temple prasadham panchamirtham

Palani Panchamirtham is a type of panchamrita, an Indian sweet, and Prasadam of the Dhandayuthapani Swamy Temple in Palani in the Indian state of Tamil Nadu. It was declared as a Geographical indication in 2019-20 and was the first temple prasadam to be accorded the status.

== Description ==
Panchamirtham is an Indian sweet made up of five traditional ingredients. Palani Panchamirtham is made up of five ingredients namely banana, ghee, honey, jaggery and cardamom. In addition, other ingredients like date fruits, Kismis raisins and sugar candies are added. A special cultivar of plantain called the Virupakshi Hill Banana, grown in the Palani Hills in the Western Ghats is used. The fruits are known for its unique flavor and sweetness. The hill banana breed contains less moisture content properties which make the panchamirtham in conditions suitable for consumption over a long period, without refrigeration. Sirumalai Hill Banana which is also grown in Kongu region has similar properties and also used in occasion of shortage of Viruppachi breed. Khandsari sugar from Kangeyam region is used in the preparation. Similar recipe is used in various local temple prasadams in Kongu Nadu region.

The Panchamirtham is a abhiseka prasadam at the Dhandayuthapani Swamy Temple in Palani. The temple sells about 20,000 to 30,000 jars a day on average and more than 1 lakh jars per day on special occasions.
