= Tharakaparamesvarar Temple, Kondal =

Shiva temple in Tamil Nadu, India

Tharakaparamesvarar Temple is a Hindu temple dedicated to the deity Shiva, located at Kondal in Nagapattinam district in Tamil Nadu, India.

== Vaippu Sthalam ==
It is one of the shrines of the Vaippu Sthalams sung by Tamil Saivite Nayanar Appar and Sundarar.

== Presiding deity ==
The presiding deity in the garbhagriha is represented by the lingam known as Tharakaparamesvarar. He was worshipped by Vishnu.

== Lower Palani ==
This place is also called as Keela Palani or Lower Palani. There is a Subramania shrine in this temple which is known Kondal Kumara Subramaniar. This was sung by Arunagirinathar in his Thiruppugazh. It is said that Muruga put Brahma in a small prison in this place. On the advice of Shiva and Vishnu, Muruga released Brahma from there. Subramania with his consorts Valli and Deivanai is found in the shrine. He is with one face and four hands. He is in standing posture. There is also a processional deity of Muruga in this temple in the same posture. In the name of Vishnu, this place is known as Kariyavanakar, referring to Kariyavan (black in colour) and Kondal (in the colour of cloud).

== Structure ==
This place is also known as Kondal Vannankudi. Later it became as Valluvakkudi and then Kondal and Valluvakkudi. After crossing the front mandapa, the shrine of Muruga is found. Near to it the shrine of the presiding deity is found. In the rear side, temple garden is found. In the temple an inscription about the conduct of Kumbhabhishekham in 1978 is found. On the either side of garbhariha Vinayaka sculptures are found. There is no shrine for the Goddess in the temple. In the prakaram, shrines of Vinayaka, Vishnu, Idumban and Chandikesvarar are found.

== Location ==
In Sirkazhi-Panangattankudi road, after crossing the railway line, at a distance of 6 km Kondal is found. As this temple is known as Kondal Murugan Temple, one can ask for this and reach this place.
