= Muthamillh Murugan International Conference =

Religious conference in Dindigul district, Tamil Nadu, India

- Date: 24 and 25 August, 2024
- Venue: Arulmigu Palaniandavar College of Arts and Culture, Palani
- Location: Palani, Dindigul district, Tamil Nadu, India

Muthamillh Murugan International Conference on the principles and teachings of the Hindu god Murugan, held on 24 and 25 August, 2024 in Palani in Dindigul district, Tamil Nadu in India. It was conducted in Arulmigu Palaniandavar College of Arts and Culture, Palani. It is not only a spiritual conference but also a conference on Tamil culture.

== Objectives ==
The objective of the conference is to unite the devotees and thinkers of Lord Murugan globally and the conference was organised by the Hindu Religious and Charitable Endowments Department of Tamil Nadu.

== Features ==
The conference is featured by Seminars, Photo exhibitions, 3D exhibitions, Virtual Reality shows, Speeches, Dance programs, Songs, etc.

== Participants ==
Thousands of devotees from around the world especially from Singapore, Malaysia, England, Sri Lanka, etc. participated in the conference.

== Emphasis on Tamil ==
The importance of promoting Tamil in rituals and ceremonies is emphasized in the conference. Enhancing the uses of Siddha medicines is also emphasized.
