= Kothayam =

- village
- Interactive map of Kothayam
- Country: India
- State: Tamil Nadu
- District: Dindigul

Languages
  - Official: Tamil
- Time zone: UTC+5:30 (IST)
- Postal code: 624614
- Telephone code: 04545
- Vehicle registration: TN-57
- Nearest city: palani
- Lok Sabha constituency: dindigul

Kothayam is a Village panchayat under Thoppampatti Union of oddanchatram Taluk, Dindigul district, Tamil Nadu. It has seven small Villages attached to it for Administrative Purposes. It includes Aruvankattuvalasu, Marriamman Temple Vallakkundapuram, Veeragirikottai, Vedikaranvalasu, Thhethagoundenvalasu, Koothampattiyanvalasu and Kondavanayakanvalasu village.

== Aruvankattuvalasu ==
Aruvankattuvalasu
- Village
- Interactive map of Aruvankattuvalasu
- Coordinates: 10°33′N 77°37′E
- Country: India
- State: Tamil Nadu
- District: Dindigul

Population
  - Total: 250

Languages
  - Official: Tamil
- Time zone: UTC+5:30 (IST)
- PIN: 624614
- Telephone code: +91 4545
- Vehicle registration: TN 57

Aruvankattuvalasu is a hamlet or subvillage of Kothayam panchayat. It is situated on the banks of Nallathangi Odai (a very small river), 18 km northeast of the Temple Town Palani and 28 km northwest of Oddanchatram, which has the largest vegetable market in Tamil Nadu.

=== Temples ===
The village has 3 major temples apart from the Head of all Gods Vinayakar Temple under the Tree called Ichi Maram. The Kaliyamman temple is in the heart of the village and the deity is believed to be very Powerful. The Kannimar temple is situated under a Big Banyan Tree on the bank of Nallathangal river. The idol is believed to be found on the flood in Nallathangal river.

The Murugan Temple is situated some 500 meters west to the Village and on the main road to Palani. A small madam (place for the devotees to stay briefly while traveling to Palani Temple from Kodumudi) is also there. Gurukulam (place where students stay with the teacher for education) was functioning in the Murugan Temple until the 1950s. A small temple was built for Murugan in 2006 and Kumbsbisekam was performed. Usually in earlier days, the festival was celebrated in summer of every year, but nowadays it happens only once in 3 to 4 years. However, a special Pooja is conducted every year. Kavadi festival is celebrated every year by bringing holy water.

=== J. R. C Hr Sec School ===
J.R.C. Hr. Sec School is a school near Aruvankattuvalasu, which was started in 1991 for the welfare of nearby villages. It offers Education from 6th standard to 12th Standard both in Tamil and English Medium.
