= Ponn Manickavel =

Indian police officer

A. G Ponn Manickavel
- Born: November 25, 1958 (age 67)
- Occupation: Indian Police Service
- Years active: 1989–present

A.G. Ponn Manickavel (Tamil: பொன் மாணிக்கவேல்) professionally known as Ponn Manickavel (born 25 November 1958) is an Indian Police Service officer of 1996 batch belonging to the Tamil Nadu Cadre. He is serving as the Inspector General of Idol Wing. He is known for his investigation on pending cases related to theft of ancient idols from various temples across the state Tamilnadu. On the day of retirement, the Madras High Court appointed him as a special officer for a period of one year to probe and complete idol theft cases in Tamil Nadu.

== Police career ==
Manickavel started his career as direct group-I officer from 1989-batch. He served as deputy Inspector General of Police, Tiruchi Range and Inspector General of Police Railways. In September 2017 he was appointed as Inspector General of Police of Idol Wing, Economic Offences Wing of Tamil Nadu Police. He has reported many irregularities involved in the Hindu Religious and Charitable Endowments Department and brought hundreds of valuable smuggled idols into India. He helped to retrieve the King Rajaraja Cholan and his queen Lokamadevi stolen bronze statues from Gujarat museum. He has involved in various investigations including misappropriation in the making of a Panchaloha idol of the Palani Dhandayuthapani temple, idols burglary at Suthamalli Varadaraja Perumal temple and global idol-smuggling network. Even though Tamil Nadu Government insisted CBI to Probe on idol case, Madras High court quashed the order and appointed him special officer with one-year extension.

A complaint was lodged against Pon Manickavel on Tuesday, October 31, 2023 for allegedly making communal remarks towards a journalist in Sirkazhi, Mayiladuthurai district.
