= Kaumaram =

Hindu denomination

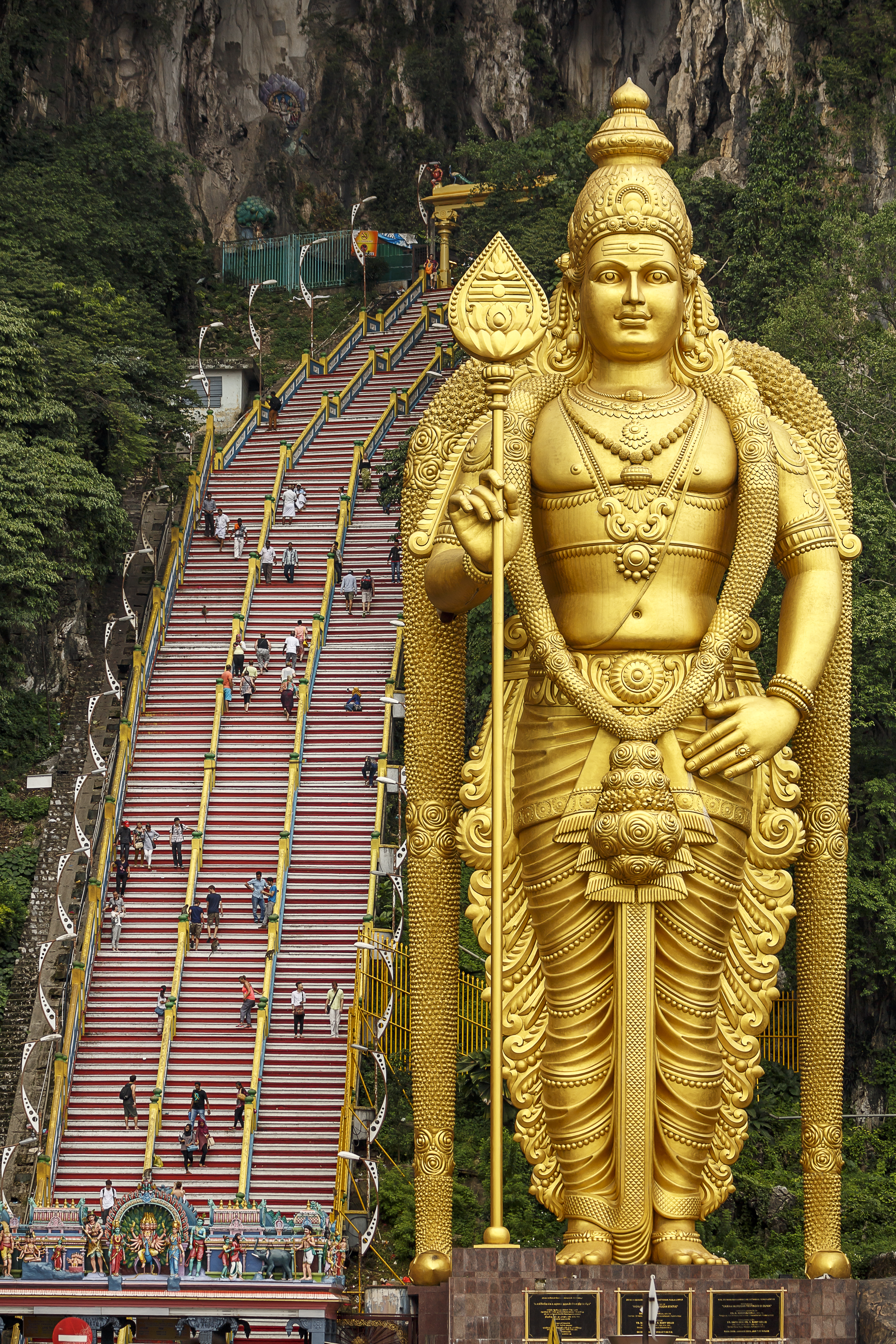
- Entrance to Batu Caves, Malaysia, with the Murugan statue

Regions with significant populations
- South India • Sri Lanka • Singapore • Malaysia

Scriptures
- Tiruppugal, Tirumurukāṟṟuppaṭai, Skanda Purana

Languages
- Old Tamil • Sanskrit • others
- An entry was removed here. Please see here for what to do.

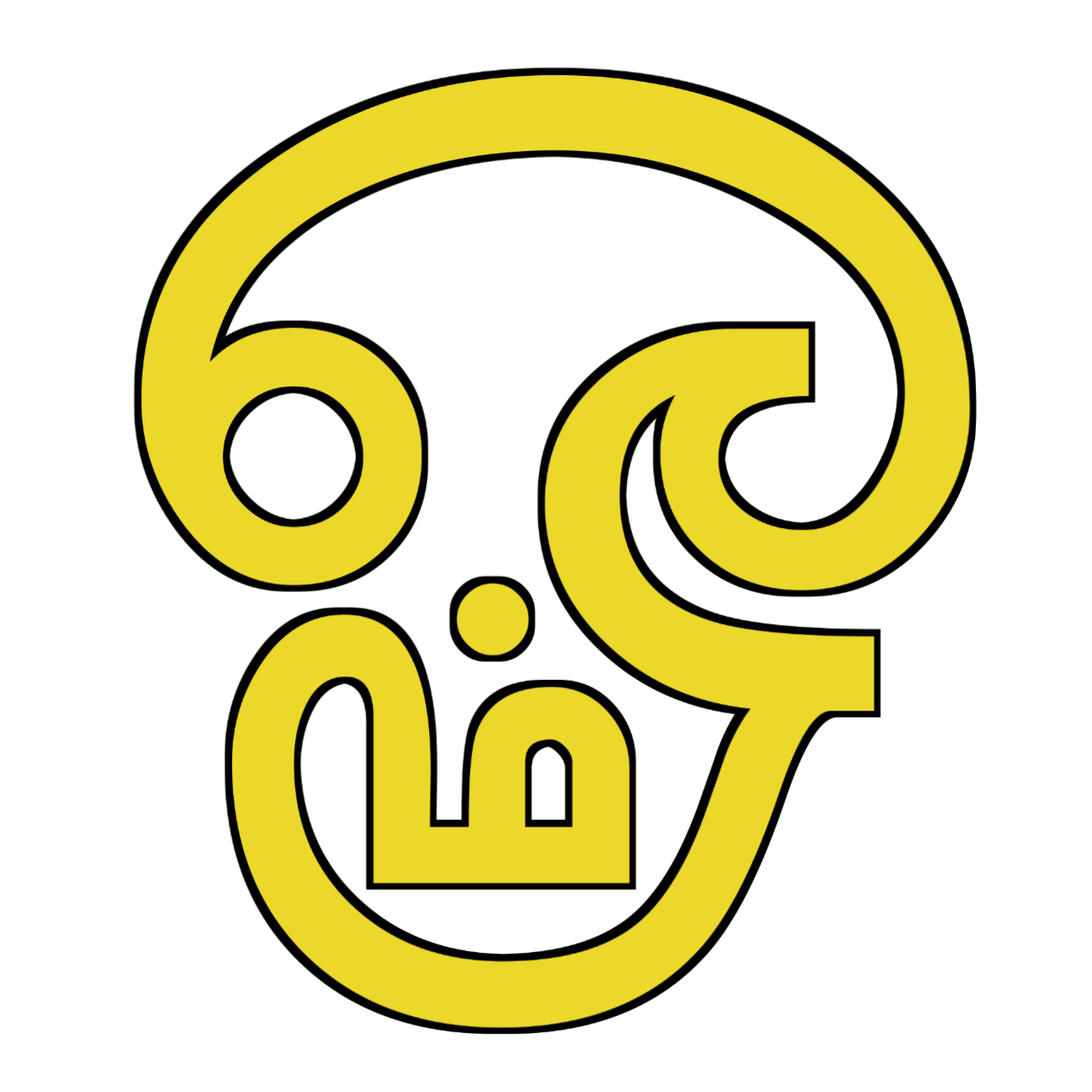
The Om symbol in Tamil. Om in the Tamil script is seen in most Murugan temples.

Kaumaram (Tamil: கௌமாரம்) is a Hindu denomination that primarily venerates the Hindu deity of war, Kartikeya, also known as Kumaran, Murugan (in South India), Arumugan, and Subrahmanyan. Devotees of Kumaran, called Kaumaras, also revere members of his family: Parvati, Shiva, and Ganesha, as well as his consorts, Devasena and Sundaravalli, the daughters of Vishnu in Tamil tradition. The important theological texts relating to Kumara are a part of the Shaiva agama canon. This sub-tradition is found among the Tamils, Kannadigas, and the Vedda, in South India, Sri Lanka, and among the Tamil diaspora worldwide. The love story of Kumara/Murugan and his wife Valli, a girl from a local tribe, is popular in Tamil Nadu, where Kumara acquired the status of a patron god of the Tamil people. (Note: The term Kaumaram also means "childhood, youth" in Hindu texts, as in verse 2.13 of the Bhagavad Gita. It is sometimes a substitute for Brahmacharya stage of life.)

== Legend ==
In the Ramayana, Kartikeya is regarded to be the first son of Shiva who was incubated by the Kṛttikās, the six maidens representing the Pleiades, and the Puranas state that six children thus fused into one when embraced by Parvati, becoming a six-headed Kartikeya. Born to negate the boon gained by Tarakasura that he could be slain by none other than a son of Shiva, Kartikeya defeats the asura in battle and restores order.

According to the Kanda Puranam, the Tamil iteration of the Skanda Purana, Kartikeya was the second son of Shiva and Parvati, and the younger brother to Ganesha. According to this tradition, he emerged from six sparks emanating from the additional five manifested heads of Shiva.

In a legend, Shiva pretends to forget the significance of the mantra Om and asks a young Kartikeya. The young boy astounds everyone by showing Shiva that it is the source of all creation. This earns him the epithet Svāmīnātha, to indicate that he outdid his father.

== Worship ==
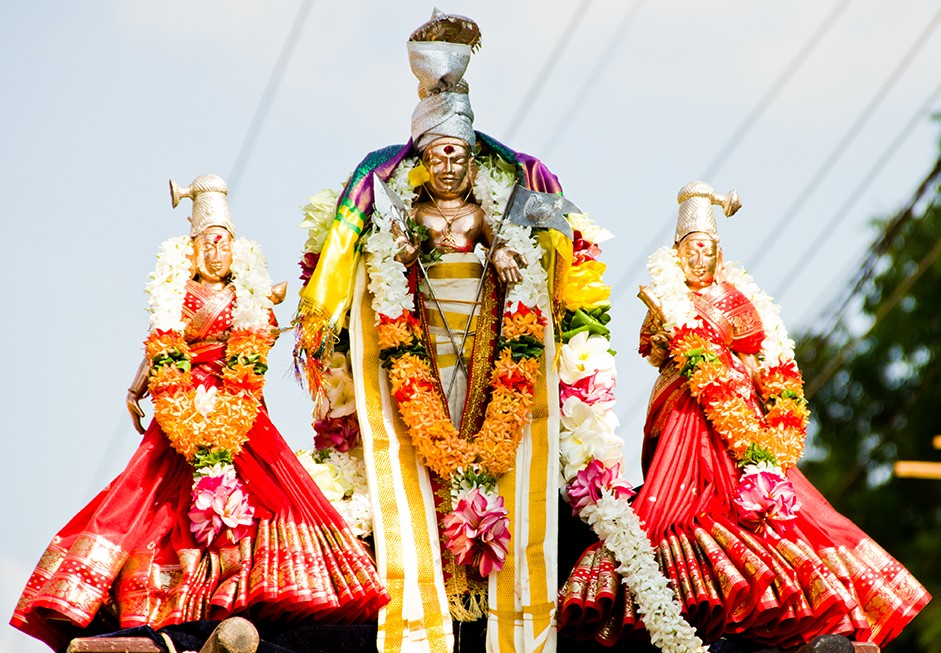
Murugan with Devasena (right) and Valli (left).

Tamil Nadu has six primary temples for Kartikeya that are known by the name Arupadai Veedu, which that translates roughly as "the Six Abodes".

Modes of worship include kāvadi that is a form of dance, alagu which is a sharp piece of metal that one pierces on the body, carrying milk and water on the heads to offer to the deity and involves a sāttvik diet.

Thaipusam is an occasion that is celebrated in Kaumaram. This is much more prevalent in the Murugan Temple in Malaysia. Another chief period of worship is Śaśti. This is a period of six days when villages in South India with primary Kartikeya deities come together for a celebration. The people involved take a vow on following a vegetarian diet for the period. The six days portray events from the life of Kartikeya. The chief parts covered are the ceremonies in which he is awarded the spear Vel by his mother Shakthi, the killing of the asura Surapadman, and his wedding to Devayanai (Devasena).

Other than this, Karnataka, that is another prominent place for Kaumaras, would have its own mode of worship. Trekking the Kumara Parvatha where he is believed to have attained mukti giving up his life is popular although not essentially in a very traditional manner.

Sri Lanka has many popular Murugan temples like the Nallur Kandaswamy temple, the Thirukkovil Temple, the Maviddapuram Kandaswamy Temple, the Kataragama temple, and the Kilinochchi Murugan temple. The chariot festival celebrated every year in the Nallur Kandaswamy temple in Jaffna is popular among the Sri Lankan Tamil population. Karthikai Deepam is an important Tamil annual festival dedicated to Murugan worship in Sri Lanka.

== Literature and arts ==
According to local legends and Tamil folklore, Kartikeya is regarded as a veteran and a guardian of the language that is believed to have been founded by the sage Agastya, with the blessings of Kartikeya. He is considered the patron of the Tamils, due to his worship being widespread among those of Tamil descent.

The primary works in Sanskrit related to Kaumaram are Skanda Puranam detailing the history of Kartikeya and Kumārasambhava, a poem by the Sanskrit scholar Kālidāsa, that literally translates as "The Creation of Kumara" or "the Creation of the Son/Boy".

Adi Shankara wrote a piece on Kartikeya called Subrahmanya Bhujangam.

In Tamil, abundant literature is to be found both in the classical texts and in the folklore. The Skanda Puranam was translated into Tamil. Chief contributors to the classical Tamil texts include Arunagirināthar who wrote hymns of praise like Tiruppugaḷ with complicated grammar patterns and alliteration and onomatopoeia.

Tamil folk music have hymns written praising the beauty and bravery of Kartikeya. Another chiefly written topic is the way he fell in love and converted his bride Valli. There is a dedicated tune called "Kavadi Sindhu" that is usually used to sing such hymns. This tune became associated with celebrations and dances.

== See also ==
- Arunagirinathar
- Deivayanai
- Idumban
- Mayura (mythology)
- Six Abodes of Murugan
- Vel
