= Dhandayuthapani Swamy Temple =

Murugan Temple in Dindigul district, Tamil Nadu, India

- Dhandayathapani Swamy Temple atop the Palani Hills

- Location in Tamil Nadu, India

Religion
- Affiliation: Hinduism
- District: Dindigul
- Deity: Murugan
- Festivals: Panguni Uthiram; Surasamharam; Thaipusam; Vaikasi Visakam

Location
- Location: Palani
- State: Tamil Nadu
- Country: India
- Coordinates: 10.438805°N 77.520261°E

Architecture
- Type: Tamil architecture
- Creator: Bogar

Website
- palanimurugan.hrce.tn.gov.in

Dhandayuthapani Swamy Temple is a Hindu temple dedicated to Murugan situated atop a hillock amidst the Palani Hills in Palani, Dindigul district of Tamil Nadu. It is one of the Six Abodes of Murugan. The temple is managed by the Hindu Religious and Charitable Endowments Department of the Government of Tamil Nadu.

It is mentioned as Thiruaavinankudi in the Sangam literature Tirumurukāṟṟuppaṭai. As per Hindu mythology, the hillock was carried by Idumban from Kailasha on the orders of sage Agastya and was made to place it at the current location at Palani by Murugan. Later when sage Narada visited Shiva at Kailasha and presented him with gnana-palam (fruit of knowledge), Shiva decided to award it to whichever of his two sons finishes encircling the world thrice. Accepting the challenge, Murugan started his journey around the globe on his peacock mount but his brother Ganesha surmised that the world was no more than his parents Shiva and Shakti combined, circumambulated them and won the fruit. Knowing this, Murugan was furious as he felt cheated and chose to live a life as a hermit in Palani hills.

The idol of Murugan in the garbagriha is believed to have been consecrated by sage Bogar, one of the Siddhars, out of an amalgam of nine herbs known as Navapashanam. The temple was built between 2nd and 5th century CE by the Cheras and was expanded multiple times over the years by various kingdoms.

The temple complex atop the hillock can be accessed by foot by climbing the stairs or walking along a sliding way. Pilgrims can also reach the top via a winch operated railway or a rope car. Tonsuring is one of major traditions of the temple. All Murugan festivals are celebrated in the temple with special pujas and rituals. Pilgrims may carry a kavadi, a physical burden, as a form of debt bondage. The temple is synonymous with Panchamritam, a sweet mixture made of five ingredients, offered as a prasadam, which is a listed Geographical Indication.

== Mythology ==
Once all sages and gods assembled in Kailasha, the abode of Shiva, which resulted in the tilting of earth due to an increase in weight on one hemisphere. Shiva asked sage Agasthya to move towards the south to restore the balance. Agastya employed a asura named Idumban to carry two hills named as Sivagiri and Sakthigiri (Mountains of Shiva and Shakti) on his shoulders to be placed in the South, to balance the weight. Idumban carried the hills down south and en-route he placed them down for a while, when he rested. When he tried to lift them back, he was unable to move one of the hills. He found a youth standing atop of the hill and fought with him, only to be defeated. Agasthya identified the youth as Murugan and on reasoning out, the hill was let to remain at the location, which later became Palani. The mythology behind Idumban carrying the hills on the shoulder might have led to the practice of Kavadi.

Sage Narada once visited Shiva at Kailasha and presented him with a gnana-palam (fruit of knowledge). Shiva expressed his intention of dividing the fruit between his two sons, Ganesha and Murugan, but Narada counseled that the fruit cannot be divided. So, it was decided to award the fruit to whomsoever first circled the world thrice. Accepting the challenge, Murugan started his journey around the globe on atop his peacock mount. However, Ganesha surmised that the world was no more than his parents Shiva and Shakti combined, circumambulated them and won the fruit. When Murugan returned, he was furious to learn that his efforts had been in vain and felt cheated. He left Kailasha to took up abode in the Palani Hills as a hermit. It is believed that Murugan felt the need to get matured from boyhood, hence discarded all his material belongings and went to Palani.

== History ==
Tī'eḻuntaṉṉa tiṟaliṉar tīppaṭa
urumiṭit taṉṉa kuraliṉar viḻumiya
uṟukuṟai maruṅkil tampeṟu muṟaikoṇmār
antarak koṭpiṉar vantu uṭaṉkāṇa
tā'il koḷkai maṭantaiyoṭu cilnāl
āviṉaṉkuṭi acaitalum uriyaṉ, atāṉṟu

— Tirumurukāṟṟuppaṭai,

The location is mentioned as Thiruaavinankudi in the Sangam literature Tirumurukāṟṟuppaṭai. As per Purananuru, the region was known as Vaikavurnadu and was part of Vaiyapuri Nadu, ruled by king Kōpperum Pēkan. The place is mentioned by poets such as Kabilar, Vanparanar, Aricilkiḻār, and Perunkunrurkiḻār. Sangam literature Akananuru mentions the name of the place as Pothini, ruled by Velir chieftain Vel chieftain Neduvel Avi. The name Pothini was derived from Tamil language phrase "Pon-udai-nedu-nagar" meaning the big town with gold, which later became Palani. As per Patiṟṟuppattu, chieftain Velavikkopaduman had matrimonial relations with the Cheras, who ruled the region from the late first century CE. Poet Ilangiranar mentions the Chera king Mantaram Cheral Irumporai, who ruled the region during the period.

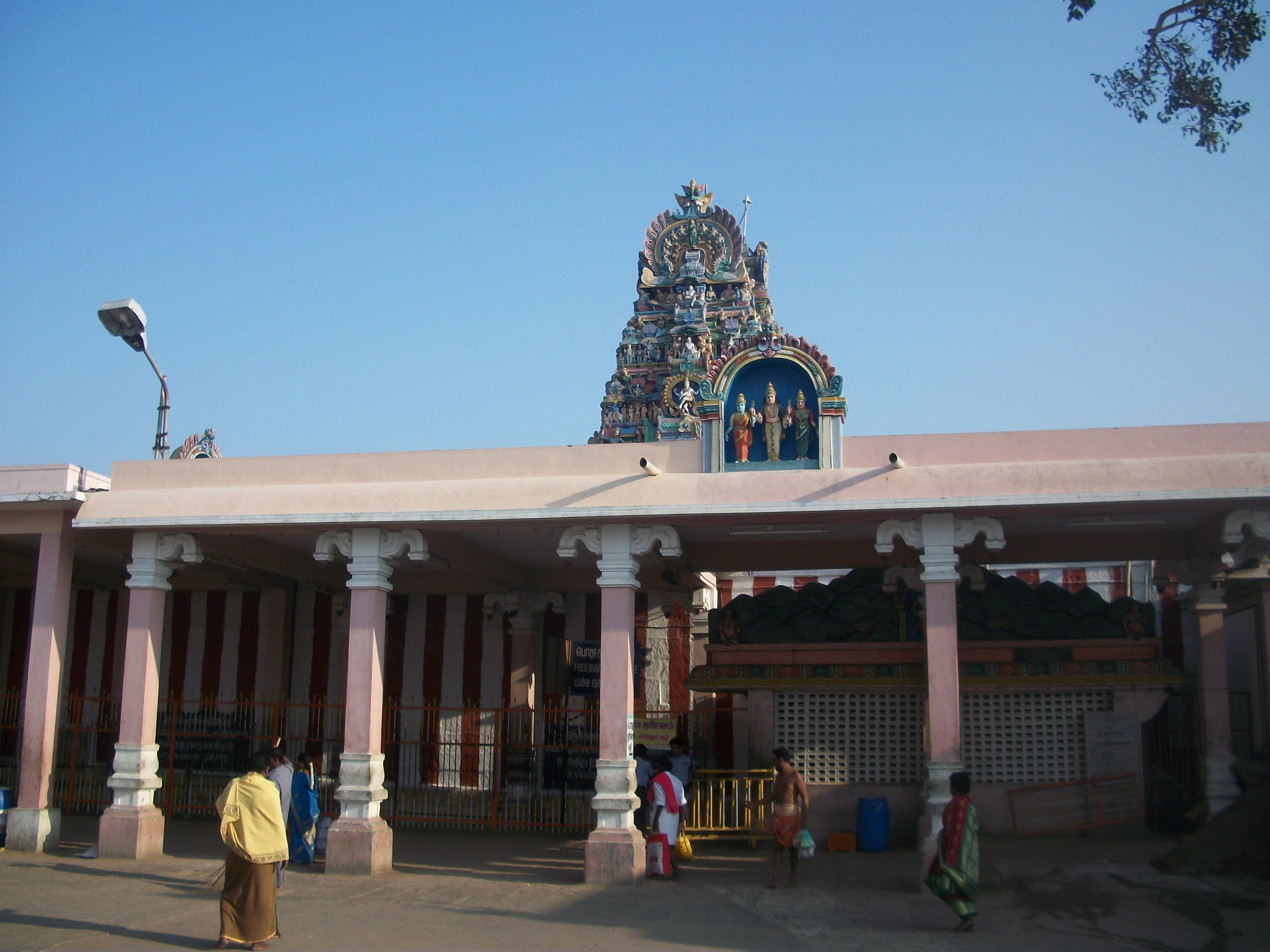
Main temple complex

The main idol of Murugan in the garbagriha is believed to have been created and consecrated by sage Bogar, one of the Siddhars. The statue is believed to have been made of an amalgam of nine rocks or herbs known as navapashanam. According to temple legend, the sculptor had to work rapidly to complete its features. A shrine to Bhogar exists in the southwestern corridor of the temple, which, by temple legend, is said to be connected by a tunnel to a cave in the heart of the hill, where Bhogar continues to meditate and maintain his vigil.

The idol fell into neglect and the area was engulfed by the forest. One night, a king of the Chera Dynasty, who controlled the region between the second and fifth centuries CE, took refuge at the foot of the hills. As per temple legend, Murugan appeared in his dream, and ordered him to find and restore the idol to its former state. The king commenced a search for the idol, and finding it, constructed a temple on the hillock and re-instituted its worship. There are figures of a king, believed to be the Chera king, on the southern walls of the temple and a small stela at the foot of the staircase that winds up the hill, describing the events.

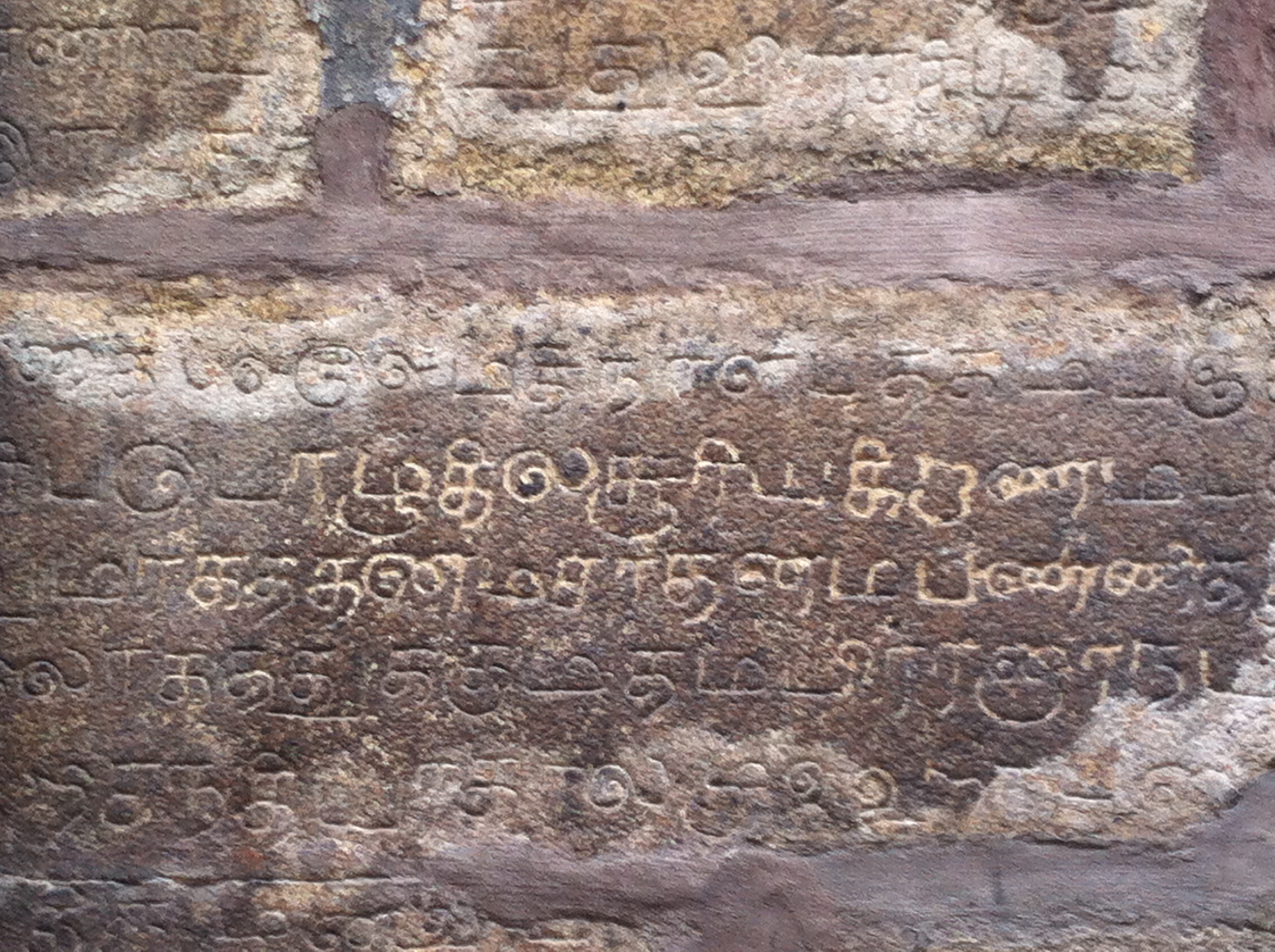
Tamil Inscriptions at the temple

In the middle age, the area came under the control of Cholas in the 10th century CE. The Cholas expanded the temple and inscriptions mention various grants made by the Chola kings. Later, the region was ruled over by the Pandyas, who further expanded the temple complex. Inscriptions found on the temple walls mention grants by Pandya kings such as Jatavarman Sundara Pandyan I and Jatavarman Vira Pandyan II during the 13th century CE. In the year 1300 CE, Maravarman Kulasekara Pandyan I is documented to have gifted a village as a grant to the temple. The Vijayanagar Empire patronized the temple and the region between the 14th and 16th centuries. After the collapse of Vijayanagara, the Madurai Nayaks ruled the region. Arunagirinathar was a 15th-century Tamil poet born in Tiruvannamalai, who later became a devotee of Murugan and visited Palani. He composed various Tamil hymns glorifying Murugan at the temple, the most notable being part of Thirupugazh. He became a staunch devotee and composed . Palani temple is one of the Six Abodes of Murugan and considered one of the most prominent abodes of Muruga.

Under the Nayaks, Palayakkarar system was formulated with the temple being administered by the Palayakkarars of Balasamudram. The region and the temple was under the influence of Mysore kingdom in the 18th century before being part of the Madras Presidency of British Raj towards the end of the century. After Indian Independence in 1947, the temple became part of Madras State which later became Tamil Nadu.

== Layout and architecture ==
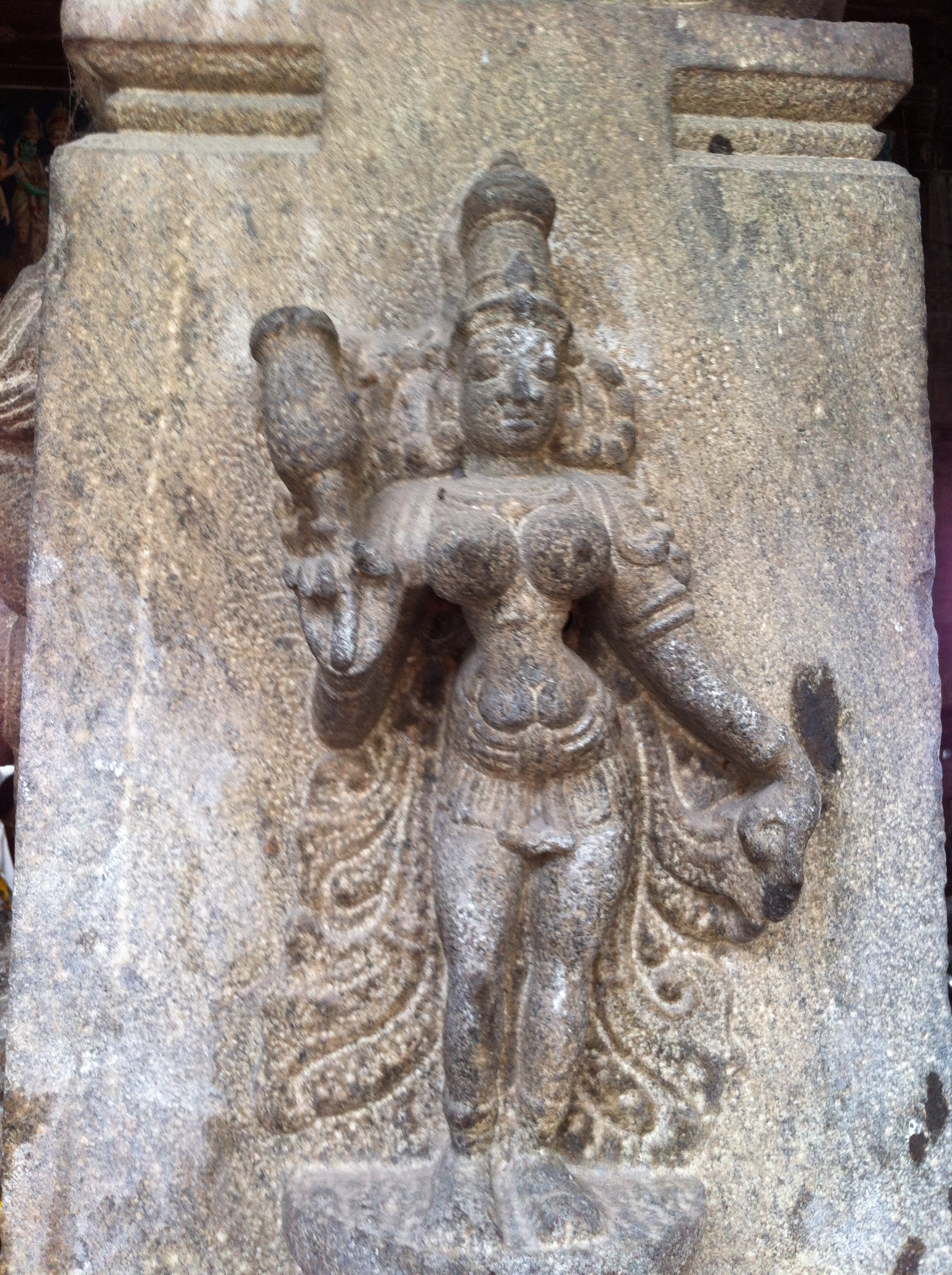
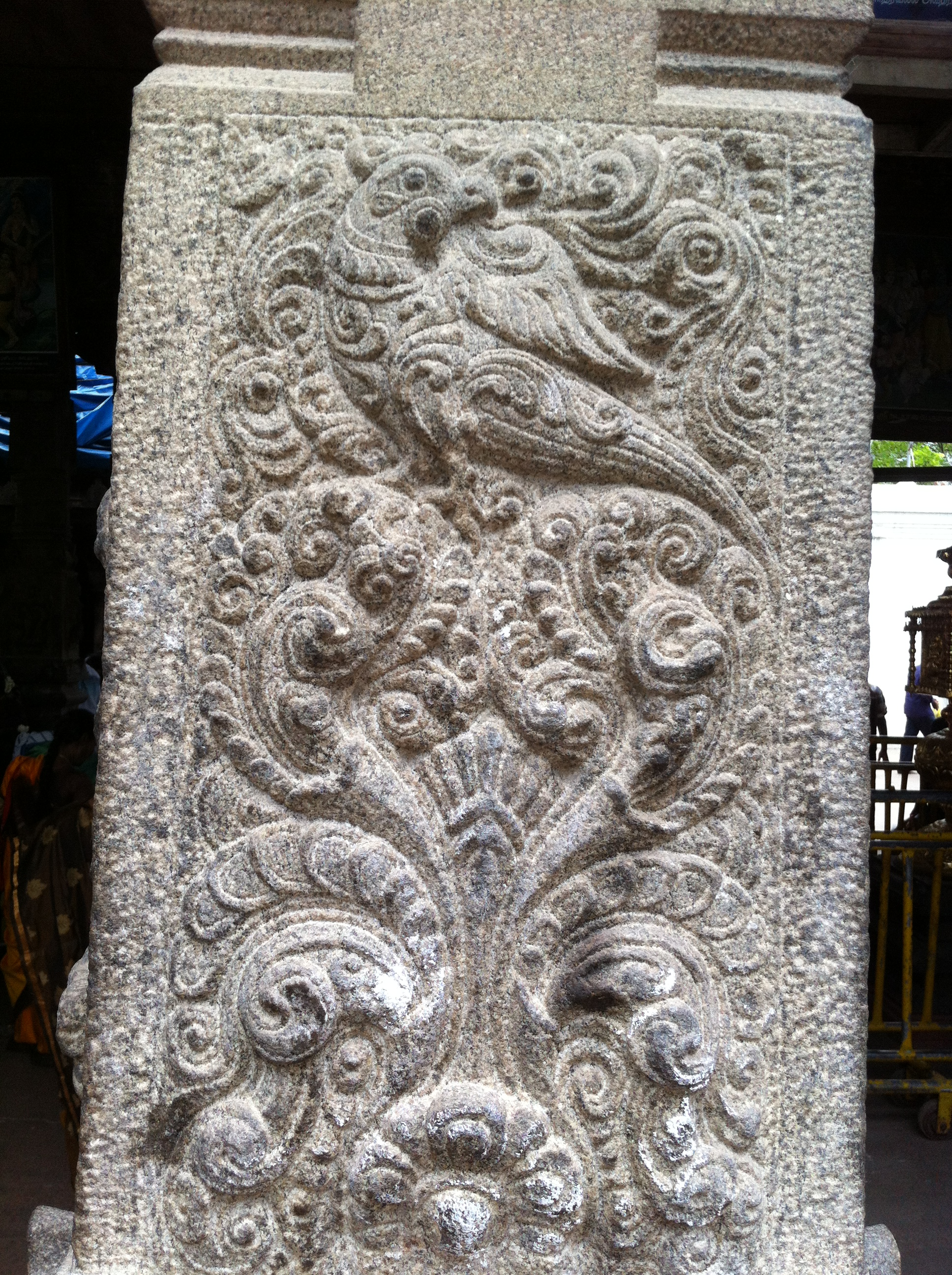
Sculptures inside the temple

The temple is situated upon the higher of the two hills of Palani, known as the Sivagiri. The sanctum of the temple is of early Dravidian architecture while the covered ambulatory that runs around it bears traces of Pandyan influence. The walls of the temple bear extensive inscriptions in old Tamil script. Surmounting the sanctum, is a vimanam plated with gold, with sculptures of Hindu gods and goddesses carved on it. In the first inner prahāram or ambulatory around the heart of the temple, are two minor shrines, one each, to Shiva and Parvati. There is a shrine dedicated to sage Bhogar, who is by credited with the creation and consecration of the chief idol. In the second precinct, is a shrine dedicated to Ganapati, besides the carriage-houses for the chariots.

== Deity ==
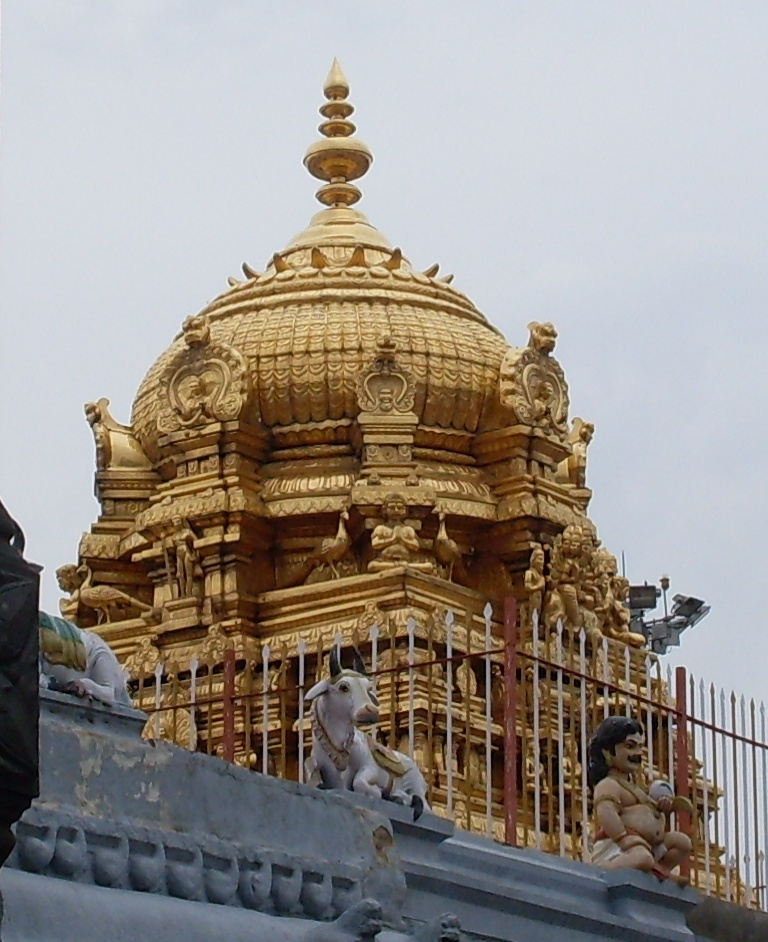
Golden vimanam

The idol of the deity is said to be made of an amalgam of nine poisonous substances which forms an eternal medicine when mixed in a certain ratio. The idol represents the god Murugan as Dhandapani, a form he assumed while at Palani, being that of a young recluse, shorn of his hair, dressed in a loincloth and armed only with a staff (dhandam) as a monk. It is placed upon a pedestal of stone, with an archway framing it in the garbhagriha or the sanctum sanctorum of the temple. The deity is approached only by the temple's priests, members of the Brahmin community, who hold hereditary rights of sacerdotal worship at the temple. Devotees are permitted to come up to the entrance of the sanctum, while the priests' assistants (Pandārams) are allowed up to the ante-chamber of the sanctum sanctorum.

The original idol was believed to have been wearing away or dissolving, by virtue of its repeated anointment and ritual bathing but priests of the temple maintain that they perceive no visible change. As Hinduism forbids the worship of an imperfect idol, suggestions have been made, at various points of time, to replace it, cover it, or stop some of the rituals, which could have resulted in its erosion. Attempts were made to replace the idol in 1984 and later in 2002. In 2003, the temple officials decided to make a replacement idol weighing 200 kg (440 lb) made up of an alloy of five metals including 10 kg (22 lb) of gold. The idol which was consecrated in January 2004, was quickly removed, following opposition from various quarters. In 2019, based on an investigation, Tamil Nadu Police announced that the new idol was made with a ploy of smuggling the old idol. Based on research from IIT Madras, it was found that the replacement idol actually weighed 221 kg (487 lb) and did not contain the required amounts of the metals specified, particularly gold.

== Practices and rituals ==
The most common form of ritual at the temple is the abhishekam—anointment of the idol with oils, sandalwood paste, milk, unguents and the like and then bathing it with water in an act of ritual purification. Four prominent abhishekams and pujas are conducted at specific times of the day and include the Vizha Pujai in the early morning after opening the temple, Ucchikāla Pujai in the afternoon, Sāyarakshai Pujai in the evening and Rakkāla Pujai at night prior to the closure of the temple. The pujas are accompanies by traditional musical instruments and tolling of the heavy bell on the hill, to rouse the attention of devotees. The idol is decorated with an attire of a king in the evenings, known as Raja alankaram.

Traditionally, the temple was supposed to be closed in the afternoon to permit the deity, who is a child, to have adequate sleep. Every night at the Paḷḷi-Arai or bedroom, the lord is informed of the status of the temple's accounts for the day, by the custodians of the temple, and then put to sleep by singing of an ōdhuvār (lullaby). An idol of the lord, called the Uthsavamoorthy, is carried in state around the temple, in a golden chariot, drawn by devotees, most evenings in a year. This chariot is made using 63 kg (139 lb) of silver and plated with 4.73 kg (10.4 lb) of gold and other precious stones.

Panchamritam (mixture of five) is a divine mix made of banana, honey, ghee, jaggery and cardamom along with date fruits and Sugar candies. It is believed to have been prepared by Ganesha to soothe Muruga, after their battle for the fruit. The practice is followed in modern times where the devotees are provided the mixture as a prasad. It is recognized as a Geographical Indication in India.

== Worship ==
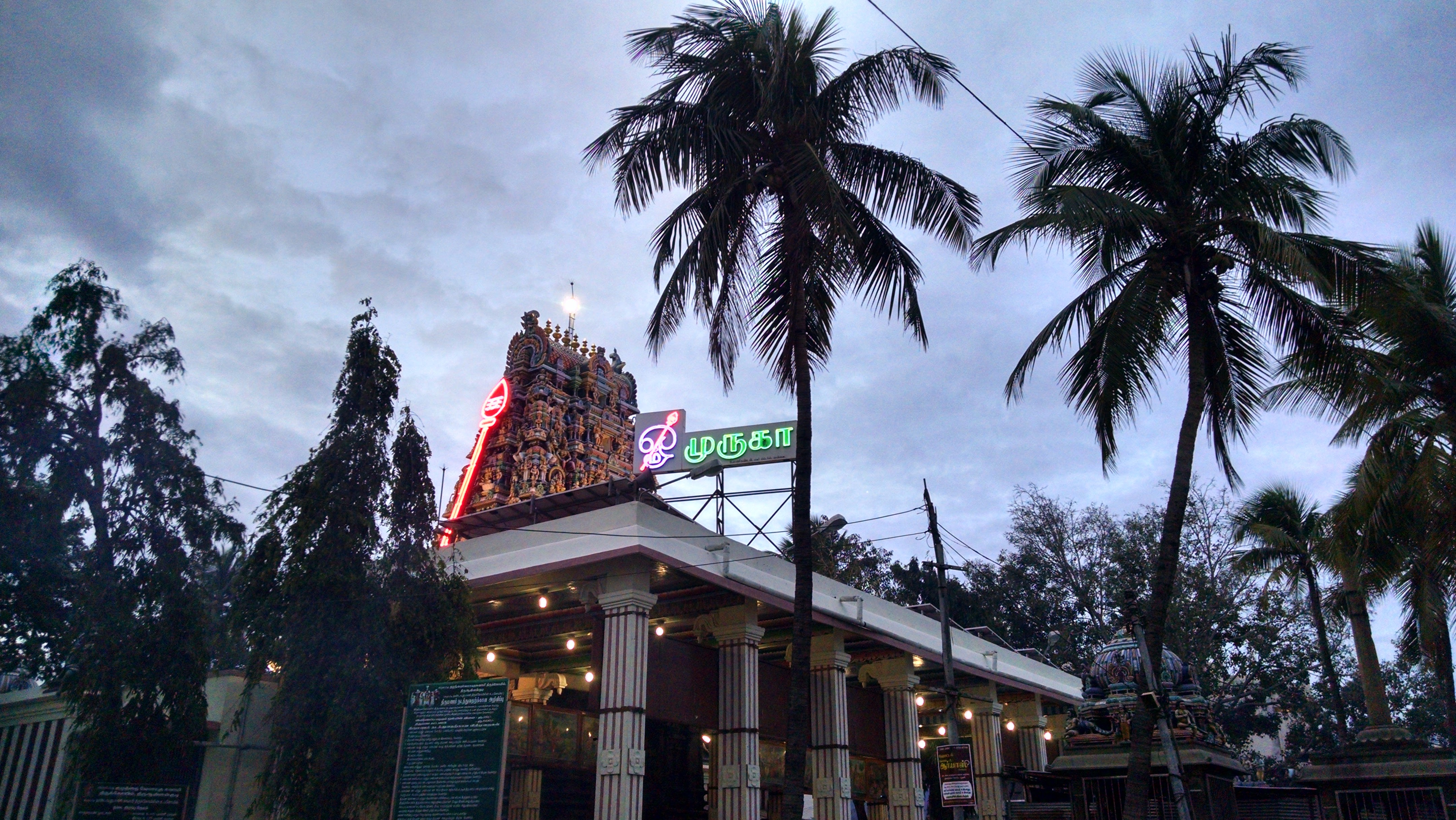
Kulandai Velayudhaswami Temple in the foothills

The temple at the foothills known as Thiruavinankudi Kulandhai Velappar Temple is considered as one of the Six Abodes of Murugan. It is located next to Sarvana Poigai, a sacred tank, which is believed to have been the birthplace of Murugan. Devotees usually visit the temple before going atop the hill.

Tonsuring is one of the major traditions of the temple, with devotees performing the ritual to fulfill a vow to discard their hair in imitation of the form that Murugan assumed here. After tonsuring, sandalwood paste is applied to imitate the ritual of anointing of the head of the presiding deity's idol with sandalwood paste, at night, prior to the temple being closed for the day. The paste, upon being allowed to stay overnight, is said to acquire special properties, and is distributed to devotees, as prasadam (rakkāla chandaṇam). New borns may undergo a ritual of tonsuring and ear piercing at the temple.

Festivals dedicated to Murugan are celebrated with pomp. These include Thaipusam, Panguni Uthiram, Vaikhashi Vishakham and Sura Samhaaram. Thaipusam is the most important festival at Palani, is celebrated on the full moon day of the Tamil Month of Thai. Devotees carry a kavadi, a burden or mount as a form of debt bondage. In the simplest form, it consists of two semicircular pieces of wood or steel which are bent and attached to a cross structure, that is balanced on the shoulders of the devotee. It may be decorated with flowers, glazed paper and tinsel work. It is often carried in commemoration of the act of Idumban who brought the hillock from Kailasha. Others bring pots of sanctified water, known as theertha kavadi or cow milk known as paal kavadi to conduct abhishekam. Pilgrims often take a strict vow of abstinence for 48 days, come barefoot, by walk, from distant places, bathe in the temple tank and go atop the hill.

== Access ==
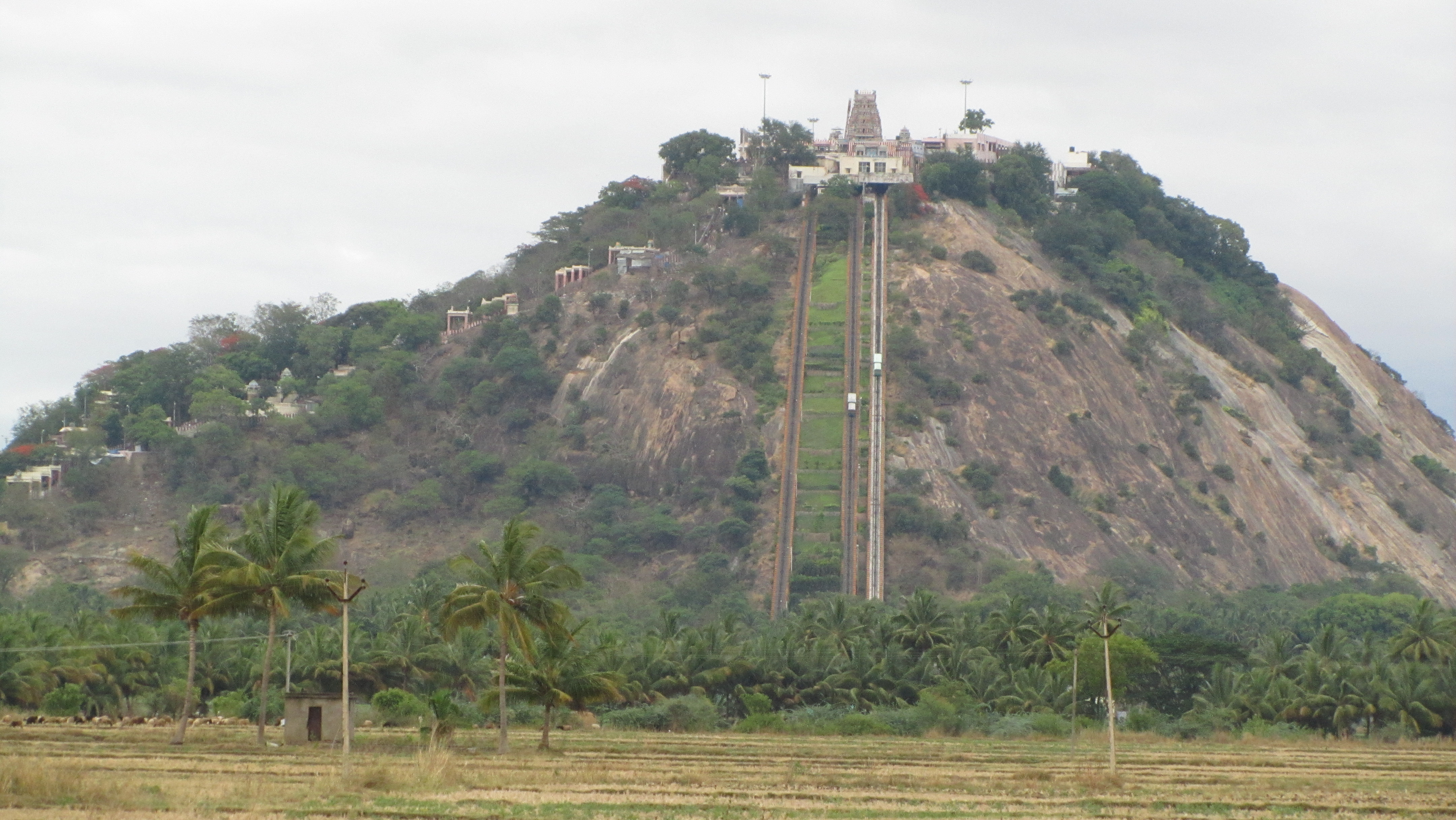
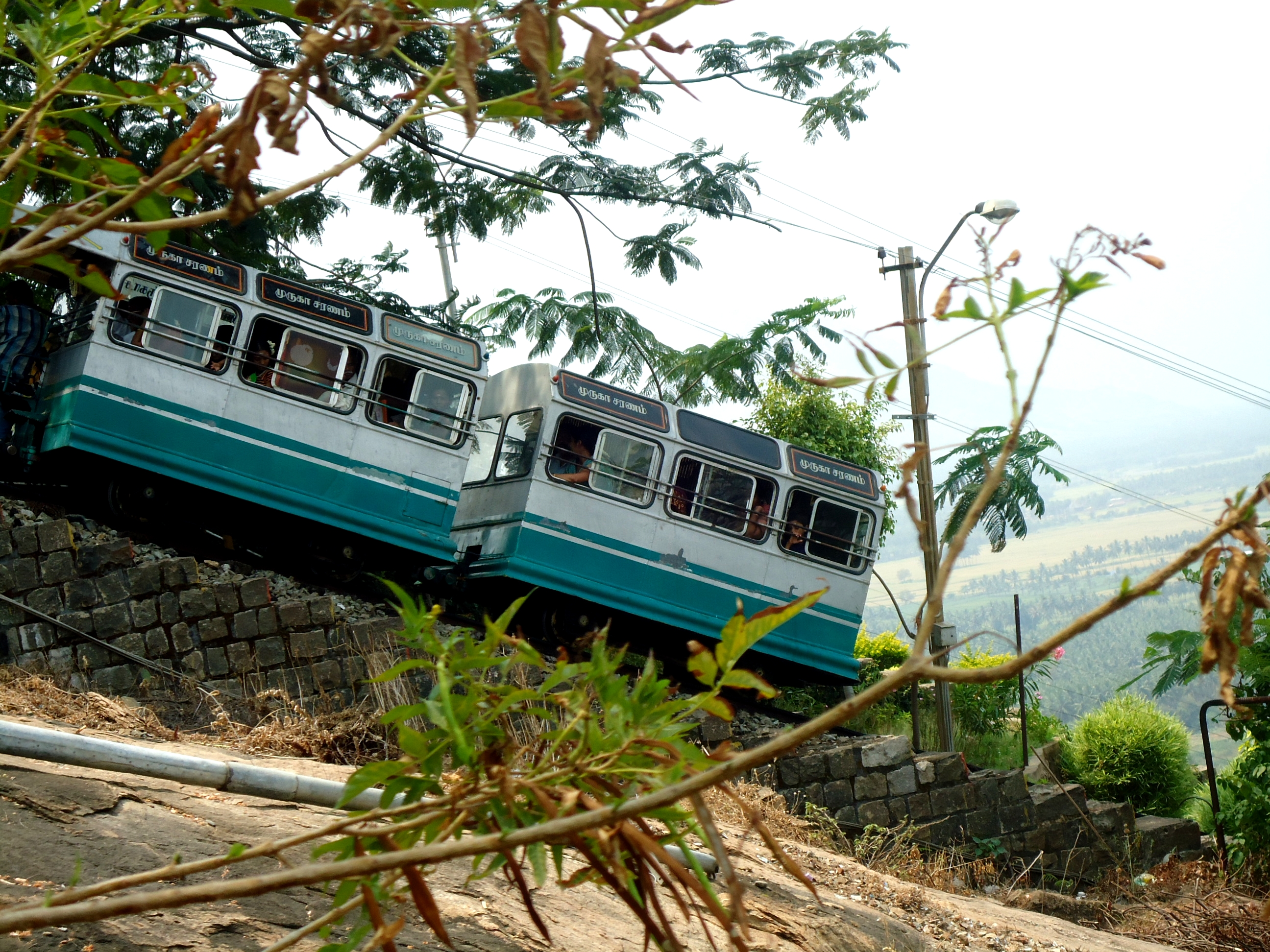
Funicular railway operated by a winch system

The temple is situated in the town of Palani, which is accessible by road and rail. It is connected to Coimbatore via National Highway 83. Palani railway station falls on the Dindigul-Pollachi railway line.

Traditionally, the temple was accessed by climbing the hillock on foot. Later, staircases were cut into the hill-side for the usage of pilgrims and a gently sloping pathway was added for usage by temple elephants. Additional stairways were added later, which are used by priests to access the temple. In the late 20th century, three funicular railway tracks were laid up the hill to ferry the pilgrims. In 2003, a rope way was added with a capacity to handle 250 people per hour. The rope way was upgraded in 2018, to increase the hourly capacity to 1500. The temple is one of the most visited in the state.
