= Kavadi Aattam =

Hindu ceremonial sacrifice and offering

Kavadi Aattam (Tamil: காவடி ஆட்டம், romanized: kāvaṭi āṭṭam, lit. 'burden dance') is a ceremonial sacrifice and offering practiced by devotees during the worship of Murugan, the Hindu god of war. It is a central part of the festival of Thaipusam and emphasizes debt bondage. The Kavadi ("burden") itself is a physical burden, the bearing of which is used by the devotee to implore Murugan for assistance, usually on behalf of a loved one who is in need of healing, or as a means of balancing a spiritual debt. Devotees process and dance along a pilgrimage route while bearing these burdens.

== History ==
In Tamil mythology, Shiva is said to have entrusted the sage Agastya with two hillocks, the Shivagiri hill, and the Shaktigiri hill, with instructions to carry and install them in South India. The sage left them in a forest and later tasked his disciple Idumban to get them. Idumban put the hillocks down to rest awhile near the present day town of Palani, Tamil Nadu but could not lift them back. Idumban had a scuffle with a youth who claimed ownership of the hillocks and in the ensuing scuffle, Idumban was defeated. Idumban then realised that the youth was the Hindu God Murugan and prayed for his help. The Palani Murugan Temple stands atop a hill at the location.

Murugan had previously been outwitted in a contest for going round the world where his brother Vinayakar won the jñāna paḻam, the fruit of wisdom. In anger and frustration, he left Mount Kailash and came down to Tiru Avinankudi, the foot of the Sivagiri Hill. His divine parents Shiva and Parvati tried to pacify him but Murugan withdrew to the hill and settled there as a recluse in peace and solitude.

Idumban prayed to Murugan that whoever carried on the kavadi on their shoulders signifying the two hills and visited the temple on a vow should be blessed and that he be given the privilege of standing sentinel at the entrance to the hill. This custom of kavadi aattam has spread from Palani to other Murugan shrines worldwide.

== Practice ==
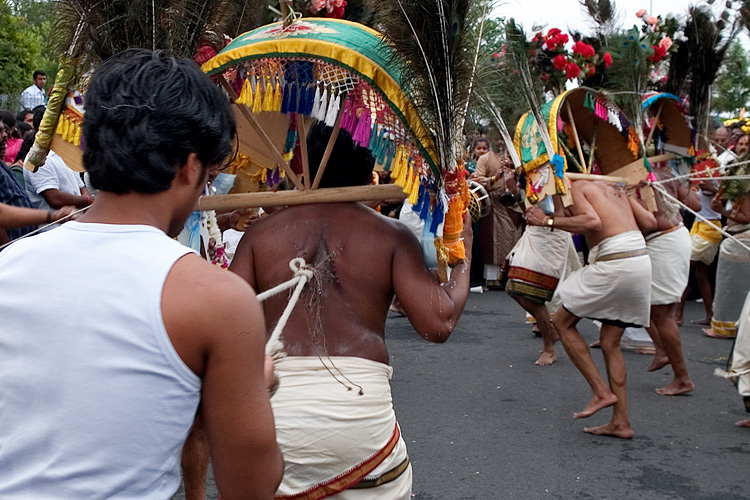
A pilgrim carrying Kavadi

The preparations start 48 days before the two-day Thaipusam festival. The devotees purge themselves of all mental and physical impurities. They take only one vegetarian meal per day and 24 hours before Thaipusam, they must maintain a complete fast. The devotees prepare themselves by following strict purification austerities that include transcendence of desire, shaving of the head, following a vegetarian diet and refraining from alcohol, sexual abstinence, bathing daily in cold water, sleeping on the floor and constant prayer.

On the day of the festival, devotees undertake a pilgrimage along a set route while engaging in various acts of devotion, notably carrying various types of kavadi (burdens). A kavadi consists of two semicircular pieces of wood or steel which are bent and attached to a cross structure that can be balanced on the shoulders of the devotee. It is often decorated with flowers and peacock feathers (the mount of Murugan) among other things. Some of the kavadi can weigh up to 30 kg.

At its simplest, a kavadi may entail carrying a pot of milk (pal kavadi), but piercing the skin, tongue or cheeks with vel skewers is also common. The most spectacular practice is the vel kavadi, essentially a portable altar up to two meters tall, decorated with peacock feathers and attached to the devotee through multiple vels pierced into the skin on the chest and back. Fire walking and flagellation may also be practiced. It is claimed that devotees are able to enter a trance to overcome pain.

== Locations ==
Thaipusam is celebrated by the Tamils, and in some Telugu people near Tamilnadu and Malyalees of Kerala in India and other countries like Sri Lanka, Malaysia, Fiji, Mauritius, Singapore, Canada, United States, United Kingdom, Germany, France, Italy, South Africa and Indonesia.

== See also ==
- Batu Caves
- Kanwar Yatra
- Yajna
- Edappadi
- Nagarathar Kavadi
