= Kalthurai =

- village
- Location in Tamil Nadu, India Kalthurai (India)
- Coordinates: 10.365054°N 77.292610°E
- Country: India
- State: Tamil Nadu
- District: Dindigul

Population
  - Total: 1,200

Languages
  - Official: Tamil
- Time zone: UTC+5:30 (IST)
- PIN: 624 617
- Telephone code: +914545
- Vehicle registration: TN-
- Lok Sabha constituency: Dindigul constituency
- Vidhan Sabha constituency: Oddanchatram

Kalthurai is a small and evergreen Village in Tamil Nadu, India and falls under village panchayat administrative unit of kottathurai in palani taluk, Dindigul District. Major river called Shanmuga Nadi is running through the village. The Shanmuganadi Dam is built across the Shanmugha Nadi in this village. Kalthurai is one of the best education village in Tamil Nadu.

== Village infrastructure ==
- Kalthurai is sub village of Kottathurai Panchayat.
- Big water reservoir across shanmuga river it supply's 365 days water supply to all nearest village.
- Panchayat administrative office is located in entrance of the village.
- Buses available frequently
- Nearest Railway station: Palani
- Nearest Hospital: Keeranur
- Nearest Veterinary hospital: Melkaraipatti

== Economy ==
Economy depends mostly on Agriculture. There are two crops based on duration per year. Major crops cultivated highly in this village includes

- Sugarcane
- Cotton
- Maize
- Paddy
- Coconut
- Tomato is also grown and considered as a cash crops
- Windmills from various company like as Suzlon, Vestas etc.

== Temples ==
Temples in Kalthurai are the Following:

1. Two Ganesh (Vinayagar) Temple.
2. Perumal (lord Rama) Temple
3. MarriAmman Temple
4. Pattatharasi Amman Temple

== Bus Transportation ==
From: Palani towards Dharapuram

- NAH, BSBS, Sripathi, RBS, 23, 19, RSR

From: Dharapuram towards Palani

- 4,3,3A, NAH, BSBS, Sripathi, RBS, RSR
