= Idumban =

Hindu mythological character

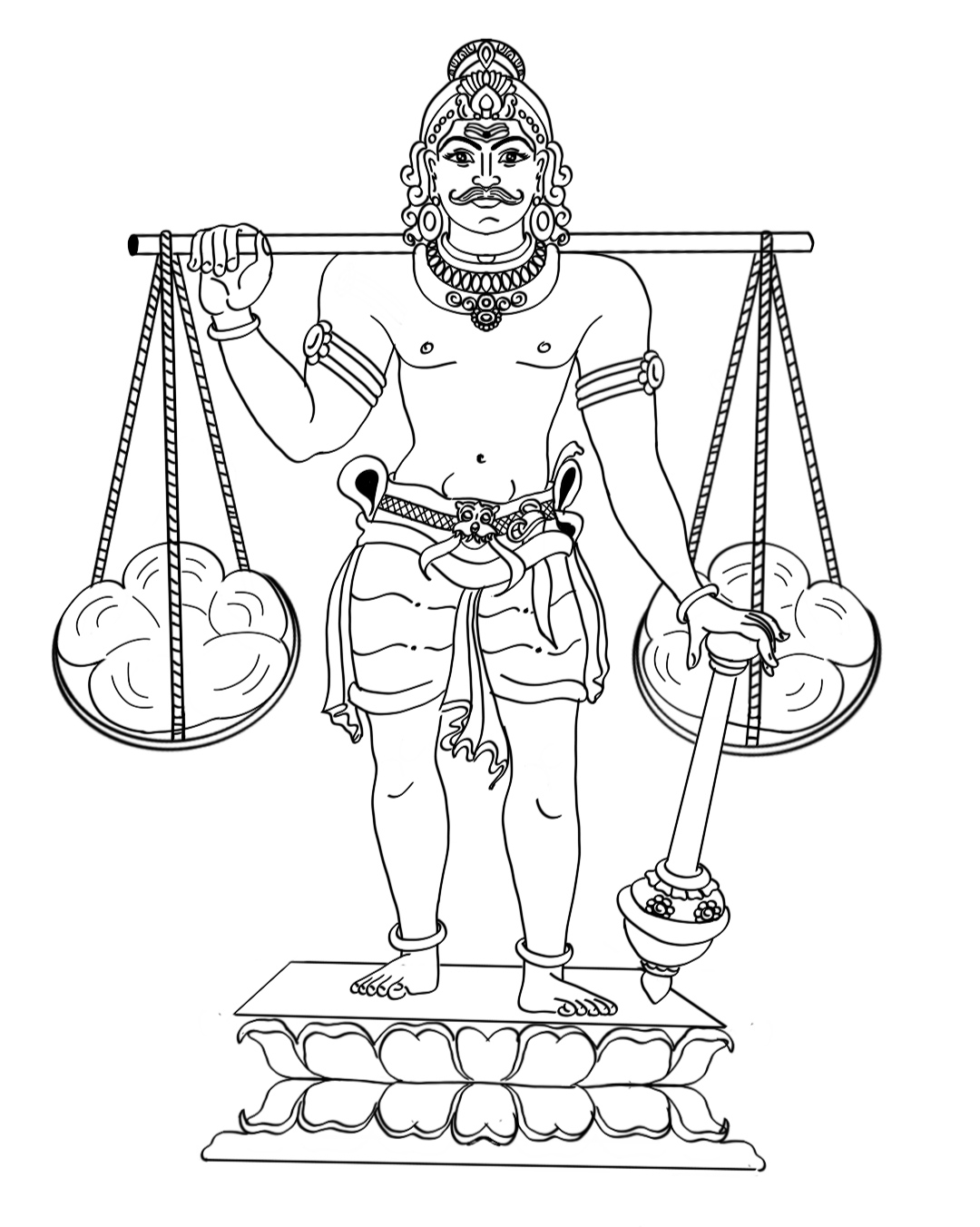
- Modern representation of Idumban
- Venerated in: Kaumaram
- Affiliation: Asura
- Texts: Kanda Puranam

Idumban (Tamil: இடும்பன், romanized: Iṭumpaṉ) is an asura in Hinduism, featured in Tamil mythology. Idumban is described to be a devotee of the deity Murugan (Kartikeya), regarded by adherents to be a guardian of the deity's temples in Tamil Nadu. He is also associated with the ritual practice of the Kavadi Aattam, in which his veneration is regarded to be a prerequisite.

== Legend ==
According to legend, Sage Agastya wanted two hills, Shivagiri and Shaktigiri, to be transported to his abode in the south, and commissioned his disciple, the asura Idumban, to carry them. Idumban bore the hills slung across his shoulders by inventing a tool called the kavadi. The tool was made of the staff of Brahma, which was employed as a pole, and two divine serpents, which were employed as ropes. When he became fatigued after carrying the hills, he placed the kavadi near Palani to recuperate. Meanwhile, Murugan, having journeyed to Palani after losing the jnana palam (fruit of wisdom) to Ganesha, claimed the hills as his own. Unable to lift the hills and resume his journey, Idumban confronted the deity. In the combat that ensued, Idumban was slain, but was resurrected on the intercession of his wife, Idumbi, as well as Agastya. Restored to life, Idumban wished to serve for perpetuity as the dvarapala (door-guardian) of Murugan's shrine. The deity declared that Idumban would stand guard at the foot of the hill, and proclaimed that every devotee who worshipped him at the site would first venerate his dvarapala.

== Gallery ==
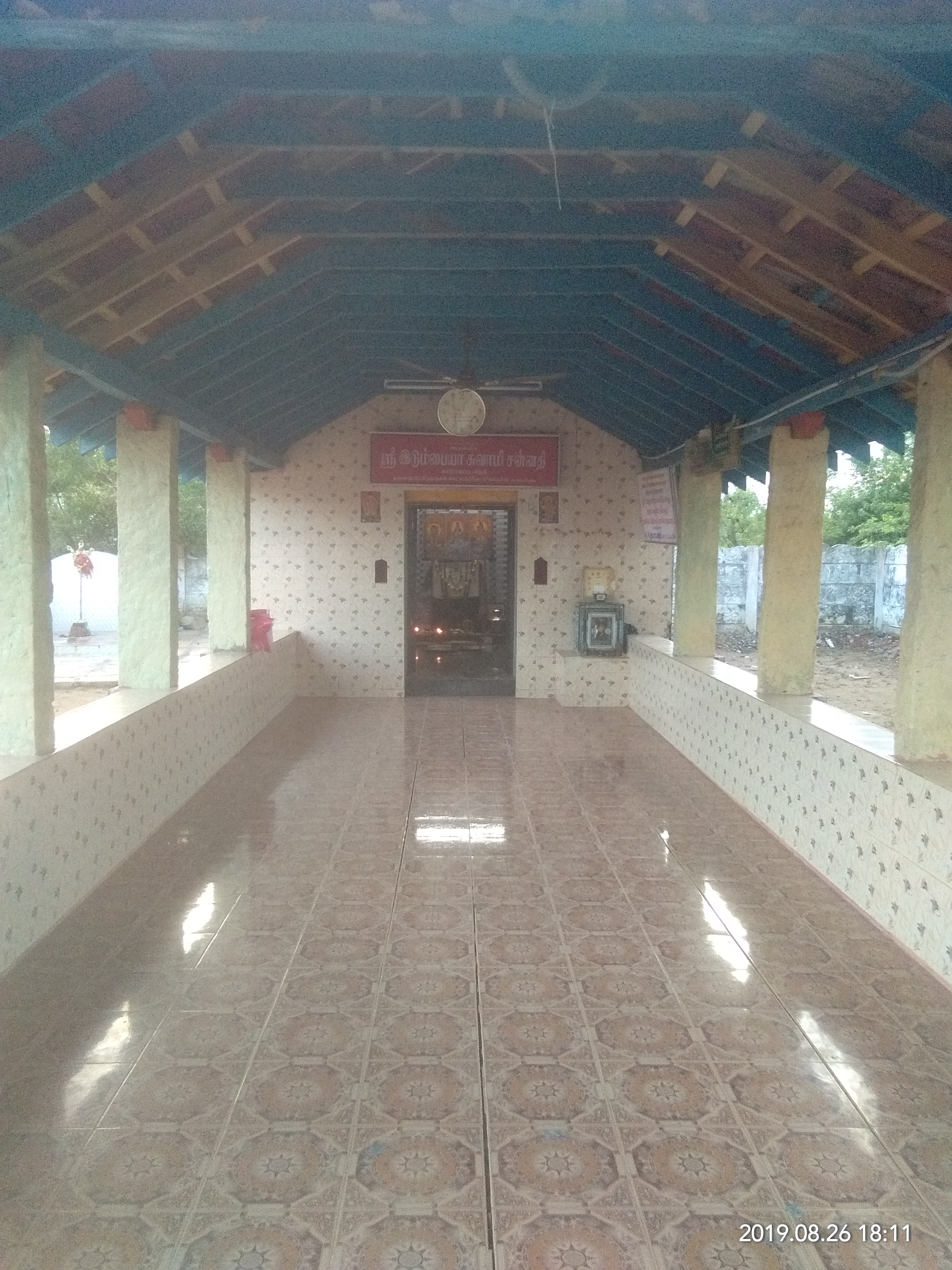
Idumban at Kaduveividuhi

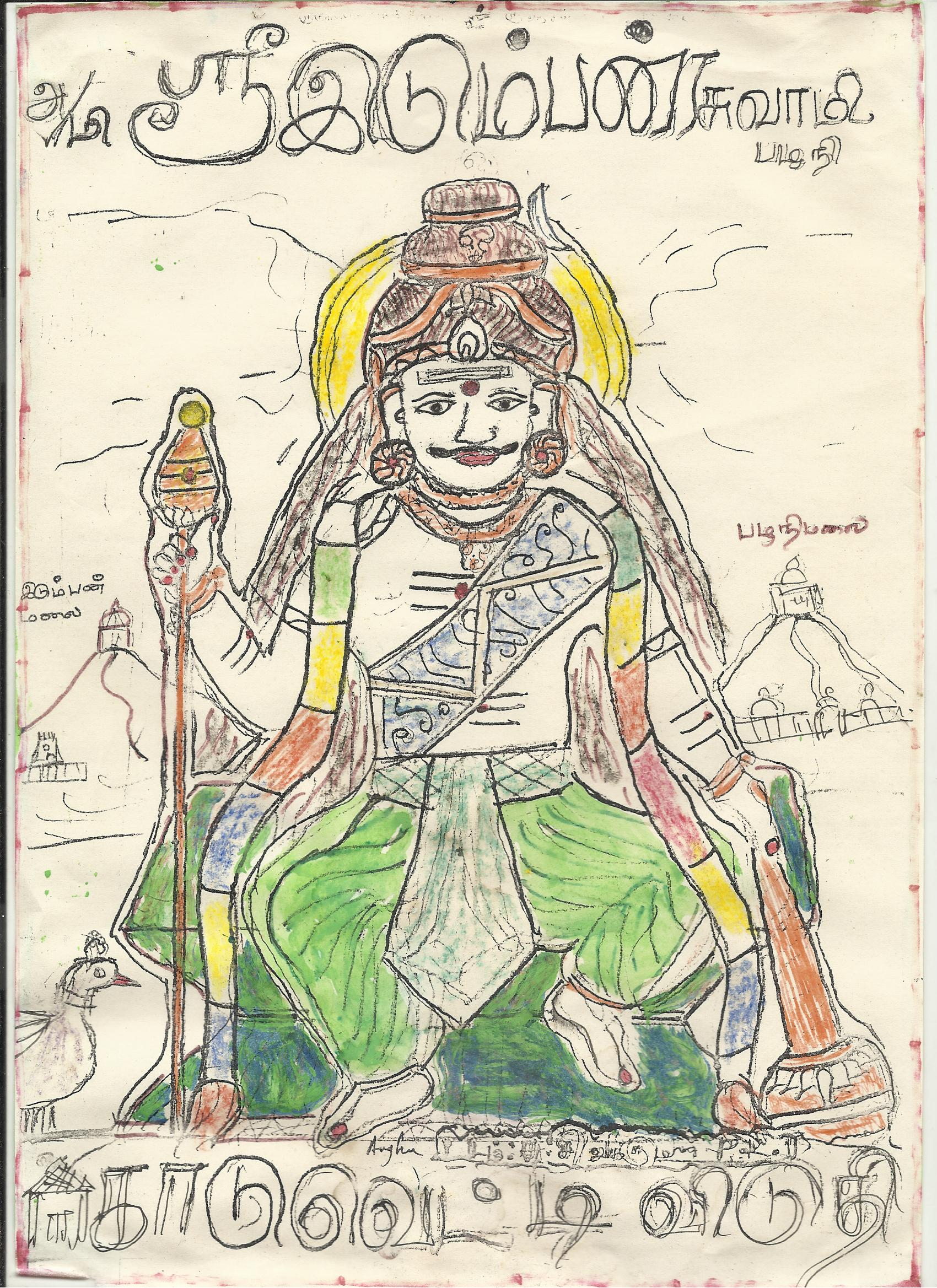
Image of Idumban

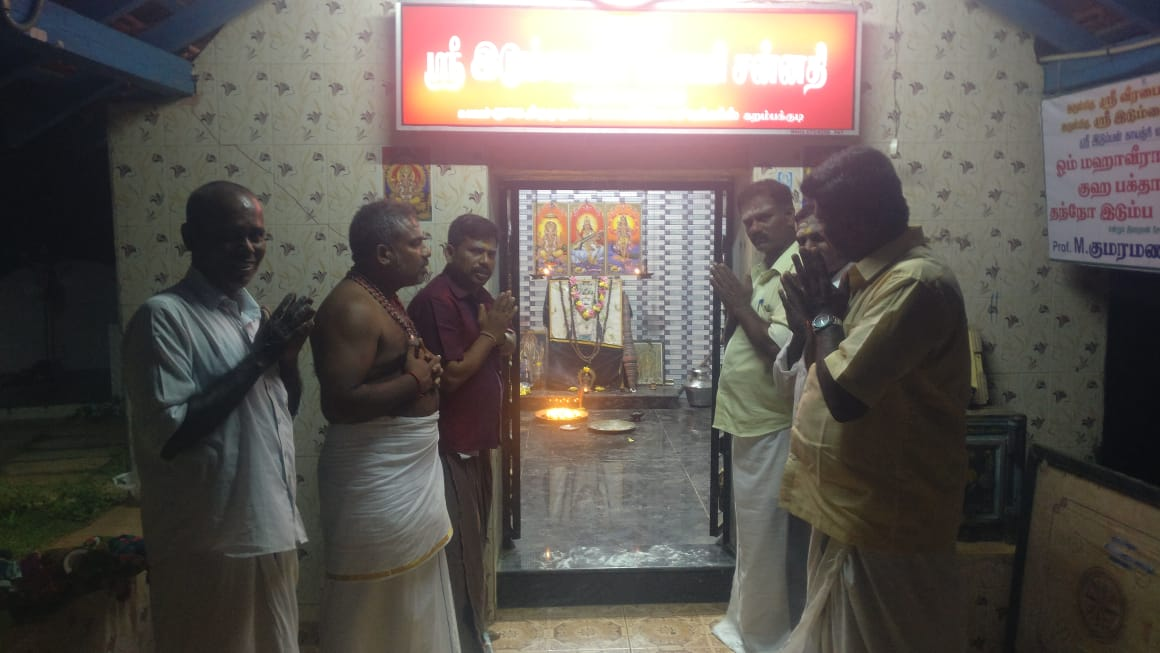
Devotees from Sri Lanka come to the Kaduvettividuthy Murugan Temple, Kaduvettividuthy, Tamil Nadu.

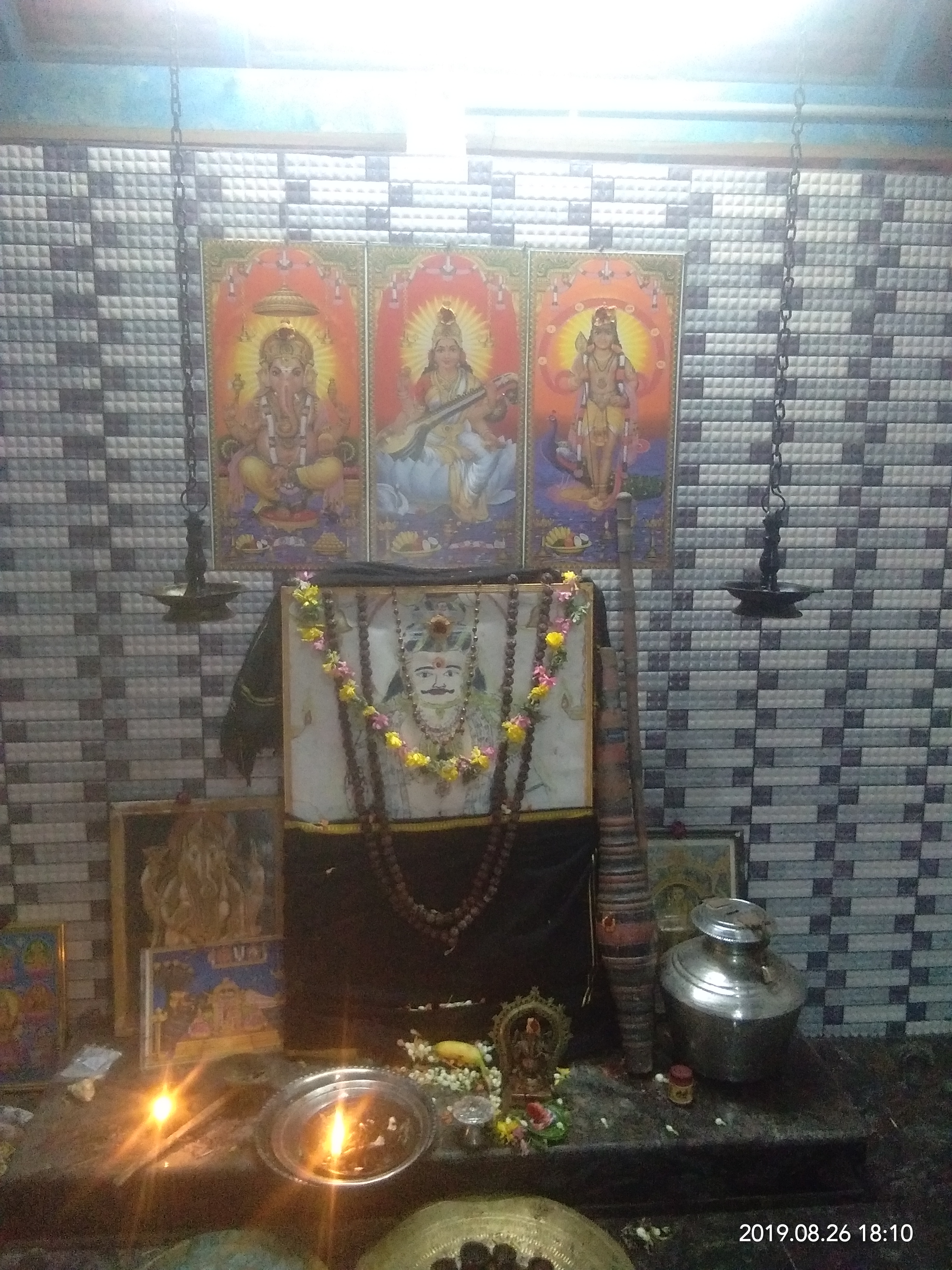
Idumban at Kaduveividuhi

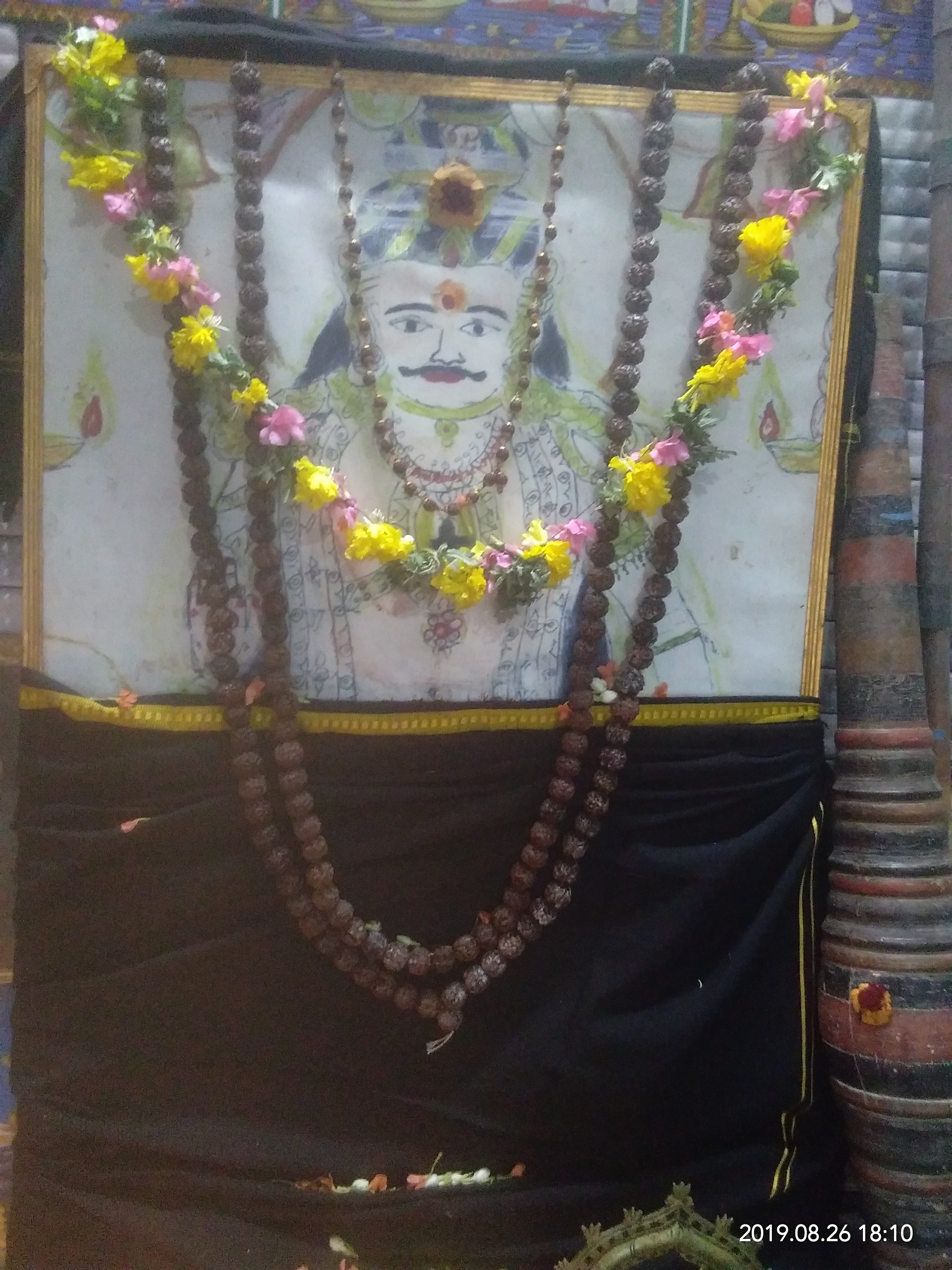
Idumban at Kaduveividuhi
