= Palani railway station =

Railway station in Tamil Nadu, India

Palani Pazhani
- Fresh new side entrance of this railway station as of November 2026

General information
- Location: Railway Station Road, Palani, Dindigul district, Tamil Nadu; India
- Coordinates: 10.4583°N 77.5209°E
- Elevation: 322 metres (1,056 ft)
- System: Regional rail and Light rail Station
- Owner: Indian Railways
- Operator: Southern Railway zone
- Line: Palakkad- Madurai
- Platforms: 3
- Tracks: 7
- Connections: Auto rickshaw stand, Taxi stand

Construction
- Structure type: At grade
- Parking: Yes

Other information
- Status: Functioning
- Station code: PLNI
- Zone(s): Southern Railway zone

History
- Opened: 1898
- Closed: 2008
- Rebuilt: 2015
- Electrified: Yes, Single-Line Electrification

Passengers
- 2022–23: 679,352 (per year); 1,891 (per day) ▲900%
Route map
Location

Palani Railway Station (station code: PLNI) is an NSG–4 category Indian railway station in Madurai railway division of Southern Railway zone. It serves the town of Palani, located in Dindigul district of the Indian state of Tamil Nadu.

== Electrification ==
From Palakkad Junction till this station, this line has been converted from single-diesel line to single-electric line. These include stations like Palakkad Town, Minatchipuram, Pollachi Jn, Udumalaipettai and Palani. On 13 September 2022, Palani – Dindigul Junction CRS inspection was conducted and soon this stretch consisting of these stations, Chattrapatti, Oddanchatram and Akkaraipatti will be converted from single-diesel Line to single-electric line, respectively.

=== Amrit Bharat Scheme Re-Development works ===
Palani railway station was taken up for redevelopment under the Indian Railways' Amrit Bharat Station Scheme (ABSS), a long-term initiative launched by the Ministry of Railways in December 2022 to modernise railway stations across India through phased infrastructure development and improved passenger amenities.

The redevelopment of Palani railway station, undertaken at an estimated cost of approximately ₹20 crore, included improvements to the station building, entrance arch, circulating area, parking facilities, waiting hall, toilets and platform shelters. Other works included an upgraded booking area, passenger information systems, train and coach indication boards, and improvements to pedestrian access.

The project also incorporated accessibility-related facilities, including ramps with handrails, tactile paving, accessible toilets and lifts. A new six-metre-wide foot overbridge was included in the redevelopment plan, along with lifts on the existing foot overbridge.

Given Palani's importance as a pilgrimage centre and its role in providing rail connectivity to devotees visiting the Arulmigu Dhandayuthapani Swamy Temple, the station's redevelopment was intended to improve passenger convenience and accommodate the needs of pilgrims, tourists and local commuters.

== Performance and earnings ==
For the FY 2022–23, the annual earnings of the station was ₹123,339,579 (US$1.3 million) and daily earnings was ₹337,917 (US$3,500). For the same financial year, the annual passenger count was 679,352 and daily count was 1,861. While, the footfall per day was recorded as 3,912.
