= Mayura (mythology) =

Peacock in Hindu mythology

Mayura (Sanskrit: मयूर Mayūra) is a Sanskrit word for peacock which is one of the sacred birds of the Hindu culture. It is referred to in a number of Hindu scriptures. It is also a contemporary Hindu name used in many parts of India.

== Background ==
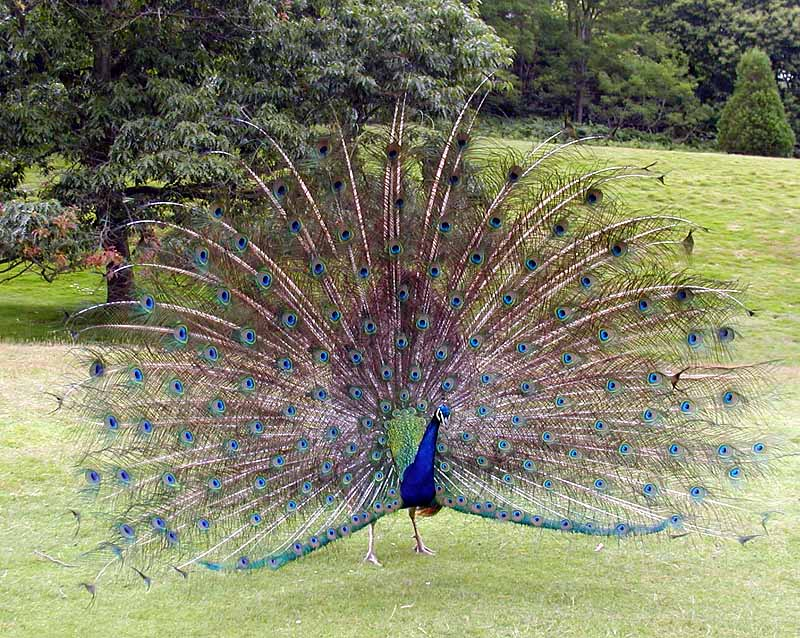
An Indian Peacock

The legend states that the Mayura was created from the feathers of Garuda, another divine bird of Hindu culture. Garuda is believed to be a vahana (conveyance) of Vishnu, one of the Trimurti. In images of the mayura as a mythical bird, it is depicted as killing a snake, which according to a number of Hindu scriptures, is a symbol of cycle of time.

== Significance ==
Mayura is associated with a number of gods and deities of the Hindus including the following:

- A story in the Uttara Ramayana elaborates on Indra, who unable to defeat Ravana, sheltered under the wing of a peacock and later blessed it with a "thousand eyes" and fearlessness from serpents. Another story has Indra who after being cursed with a thousand ulcers was transformed into a peacock with a thousand eyes. The thousand eyes refer to the eyespots on the feathers.
- Kartikeya is generally depicted with a mayura and the mayura also serves as his conveyance.
- The mayura named Paravani serves as the conveyance of the god Kartikeya.
- Krishna is generally depicted with peacock feathers adorning his head.
- Lakshmi, the consort of Vishnu, is the goddess of prosperity, luck and beauty; she is symbolized by the mayura.
- Mayuresvara an incarnation of Ganesha, whose mount is a peacock (in the Ganesha Purana)
- The mayura named Citramekhala is associated with Saraswati, a deity representing benevolence, patience, kindness, compassion and knowledge.
- Sri Chanda Bhairavar, one of the Ashta Bhairava ("Eight Bhairavas"); whose mount is a peacock.
- Vikata (Vikaṭa) ("unusual form", "misshapen"), an avatar of Ganesha, whose mount is a peacock (in the Mudgala Purana).

In general, feathers of mayura are considered sacred and are used to dust the religious images and implements of Hindus.

In Asian folklore, especially in that of the Vedda of Sri Lanka the peacock deserves a charm of praise since this bird kills centipedes and snakes.

== See also ==
- Argus Panoptes
- Mahamayuri
- Melek Taûs
