= Jnana Palam =

Fruit of wisdom in Hinduism

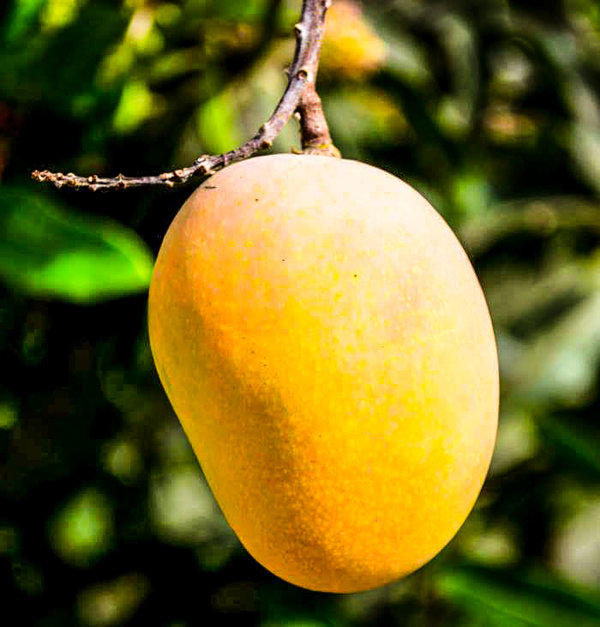
The jnana palam is sometimes described to be a golden mango

Jnana palam (Tamil: ஞானப்பழம், romanized: Jñāna paḻam, lit. 'Fruit of wisdom'), also rendered Gnana Palam, is the name of a divine fruit in Hindu mythology. It is associated with the myth of Murugan and Ganesha participating in a contest, and the former's sacred abode of Palani. Presented by the sage Narada to Shiva, the jnana palam is regarded to have possessed the elixir of wisdom. In some iterations, the jnana palam is described to be a golden mango.

== Legend ==
According to legend, the sage Narada once visited Shiva at his abode of Kailash, and presented the jnana palam to him. Shiva chose to present the divine fruit to one of his two sons, Murugan or Ganesha, and set forth a contest: The first one able to circle the world thrice would be awarded with the prize. Murugan, who interpreted the instruction literally, instantly mounted his peacock, and started his journey. Ganesha, whose own mount was a mouse, interpreted the instruction metaphysically, and proclaimed his belief that the world, in fact, was embodied by his parents, Shiva and Parvati. He proceeded to circumambulate them thrice. Pleased with his wisdom, the jnana palam was awarded to Ganesha. When Murugan returned, he was furious that his brother had won the fruit, believing that the latter had resorted to trickery. He renounced his grandeur and exalted position at Kailash, and retired to the hills of Palani as a hermit, where it became one of his six sacred abodes.

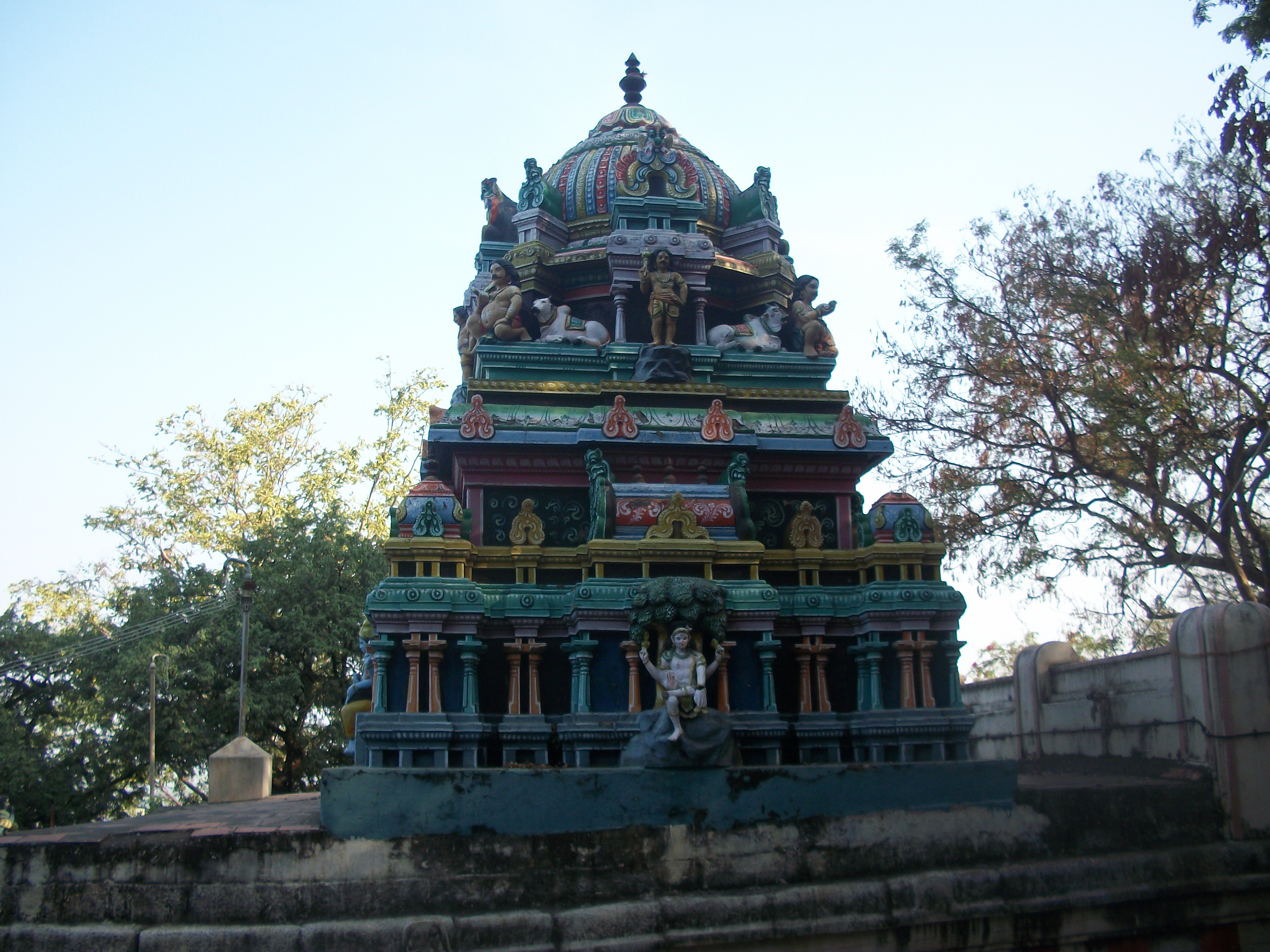
The Palani temple traces its mythological origin to the fruit of wisdom

Shiva and Parvati are believed to have travelled to Palani to urge him to return. They attempted to pacify him, remarking that Murugan himself was the divine fruit. Popular etymology holds that the origin of the town "Palani" is a contraction of the Tamil form of this aforementioned statement, transliterated as "Paḻam nī", meaning, "Fruit, you".

== Symbolism ==
Kamil Zvelebil regards this myth to mean that "Murugan is the fruit (paḻam) of his devotees' devotion, much more delicious than any other fruit, mango or pomegranate".

== In popular culture ==
- The Tamil film Gnanapazham is named after this fruit.
- The 1965 Tamil film Thiruvilaiyadal revolves around the events of this myth.
