= Panchamrita =

Mixture of few foods used in Hindus and Jain worship

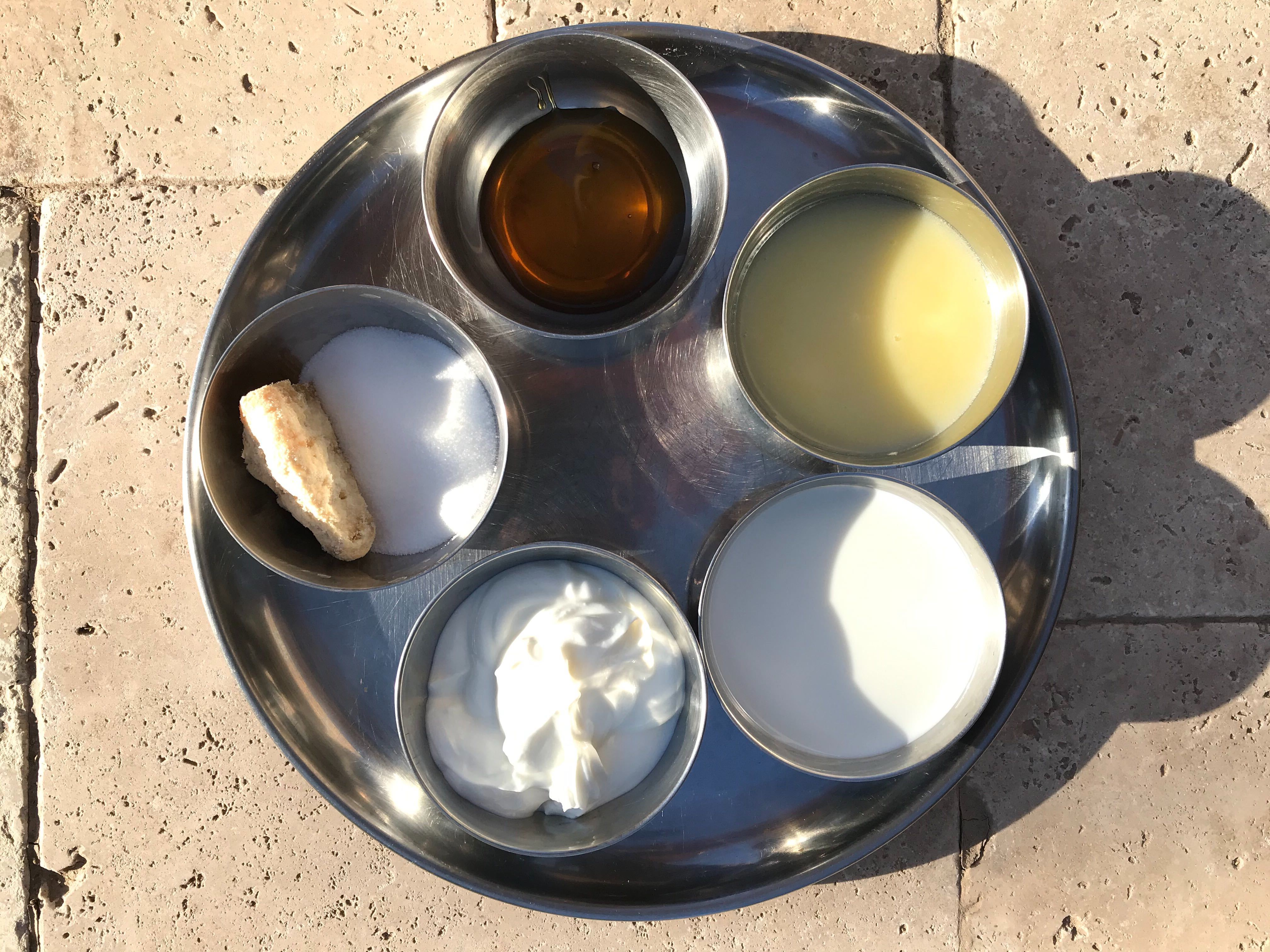
The ingredients of panchamrita: (clockwise from bottom right) milk, curd, sugar (or jaggery), honey and ghee

Panchamrita (Sanskrit: पञ्चामृत, lit. 'five Amṛtas') is a sacred mixture of five ingredients used in Hindu and Jain worship, particularly during puja and abhiṣeka rituals. It is often offered to the deities during puja and later distributed to devotees as prasad.

The main ingredients typically include honey (मधु), sugar (शर्करा), cow milk (दुग्ध), curd (दधि) and ghee (घृत)

The abhiṣeka starts with ghee. A conch full of cow's ghee is poured on the head of the idol and it flows down up to feet. Then milk, curd, honey and sugar are poured. While a variety of additional regional ingredients such as, cardamom, banana, tender coconut, and dates are used, the five base ingredients remain the same across all of India.

In Tamil Nadu, panchamritam (Tamil: பஞ்சாமிர்தம்) is a mixture of banana, ghee, honey, jaggery and cardamom. In addition, other substances like seedless dates and sugar candies are added. Keralites may also include tender coconut. Some recipes also include grapes.

Palani Dhandayuthapani temple located in Tamil Nadu is popular for its unique panchamirtham which uses Virupachi hill bananas grown in the surrounding Palani hills. It received its unique Geographical indication in 2019 from the Government of India.

== Also See ==
Abhisheka
