= Palani =

- Town
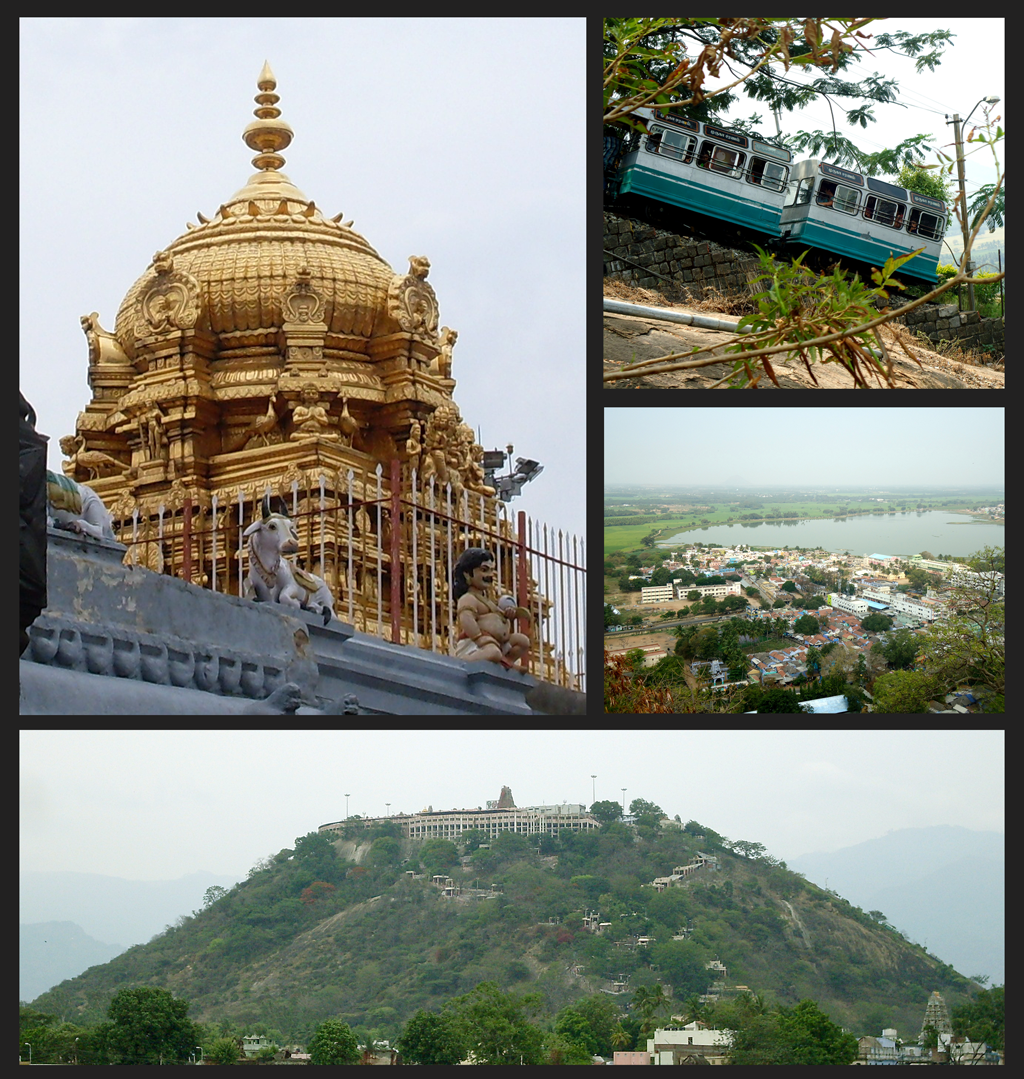
- Clockwise from top left: Gopuram of Palani Murugan temple, Winch pulled car climbing uphill, Vaiyapuri Pond, View of temple atop the hill
- Nickname: Thiru-Avinankudi
- Palani, Tamil Nadu
- Coordinates: 10.450000°N 77.516100°E
- Country: India
- State: Tamil Nadu
- Region: Kongu Nadu
- District: Dindigul

Government
  - Type: Special Grade Municipality
- Elevation: 341 m (1,119 ft)

Population (2011)
  - Total: 70,467
- Time zone: UTC+5:30 (IST)
- PIN: 624 601
- Telephone code: 04545
- Vehicle registration: TN 94
- Website: palanimurugantemple.org

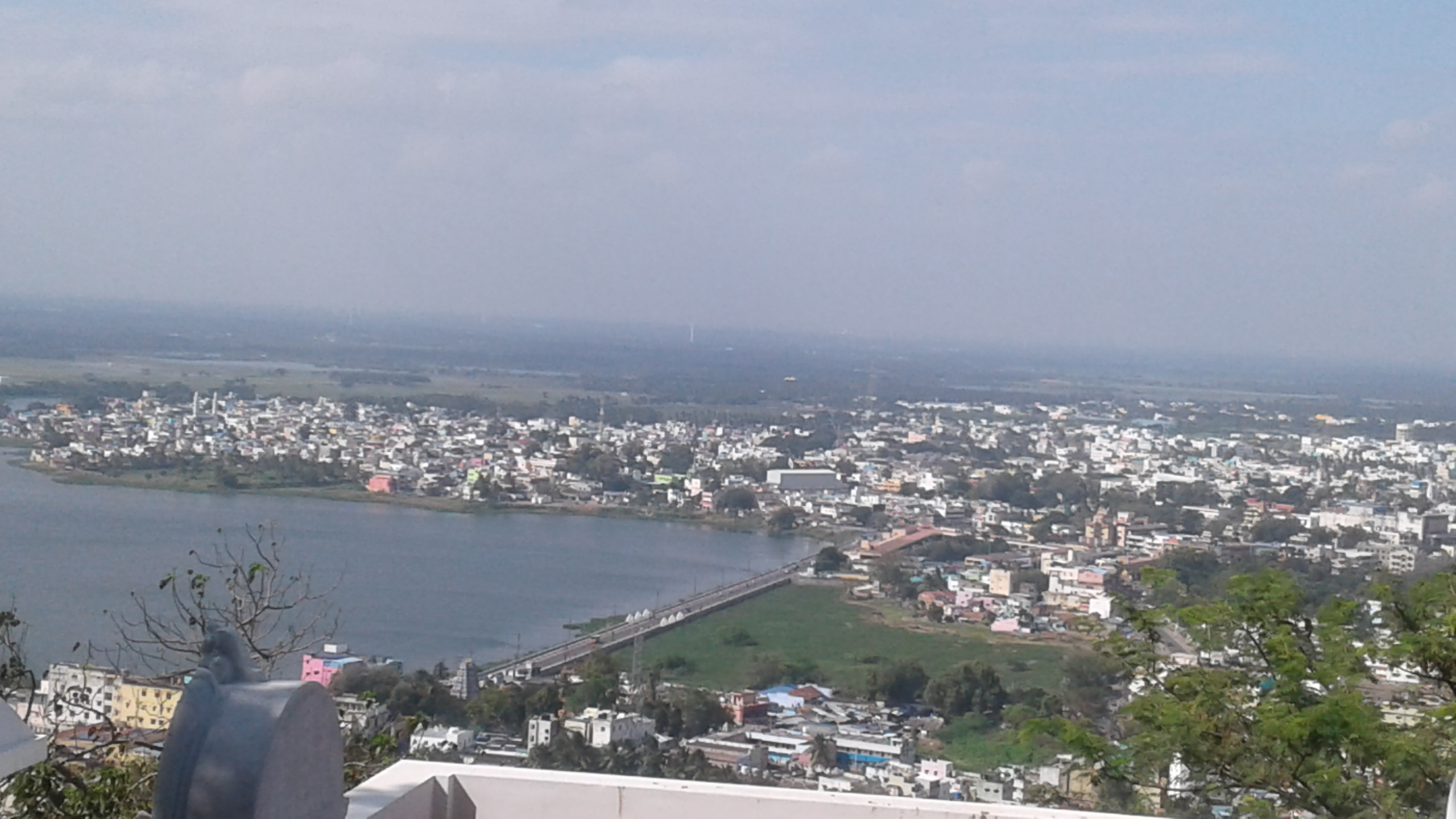
View of Palani Town

Palani or Pazhani (Tamil: [paɻani]) is a town in Dindigul district of Tamil Nadu state in India. It is located about 60 kilometres (37 mi) west of Dindigul, 106 kilometres (66 mi) south-east of Coimbatore, 122 kilometres (76 mi) north-west of Madurai, 67 kilometres (42 mi) from Kodaikanal. The Palani Murugan Temple or Arulmigu Dhandayuthapani Swamy Temple (Thiru Avinankudi), dedicated to Murugan is situated on a hill overlooking the town. The temple is visited by more than 7 million pilgrims each year. As of 2011, the town had a population of 70,467 and the Taluk had a population of 292,301 which makes it the second largest town in the district after Dindigul.

== Etymology ==
The town derives its name from the compounding of two Tamil words palam meaning fruit and nee meaning you, a reference to poet Avvaiyar's song praising Muruga which forms part of the legend of the Palani Murugan temple. But the actual correct word is பழம்நீர் which means place surrounded by fruit with water (Coconut and Palm trees). The word கழனி which is similar in name, both gives agricultural meanings, here கழனி means வயல் (field).

== History ==
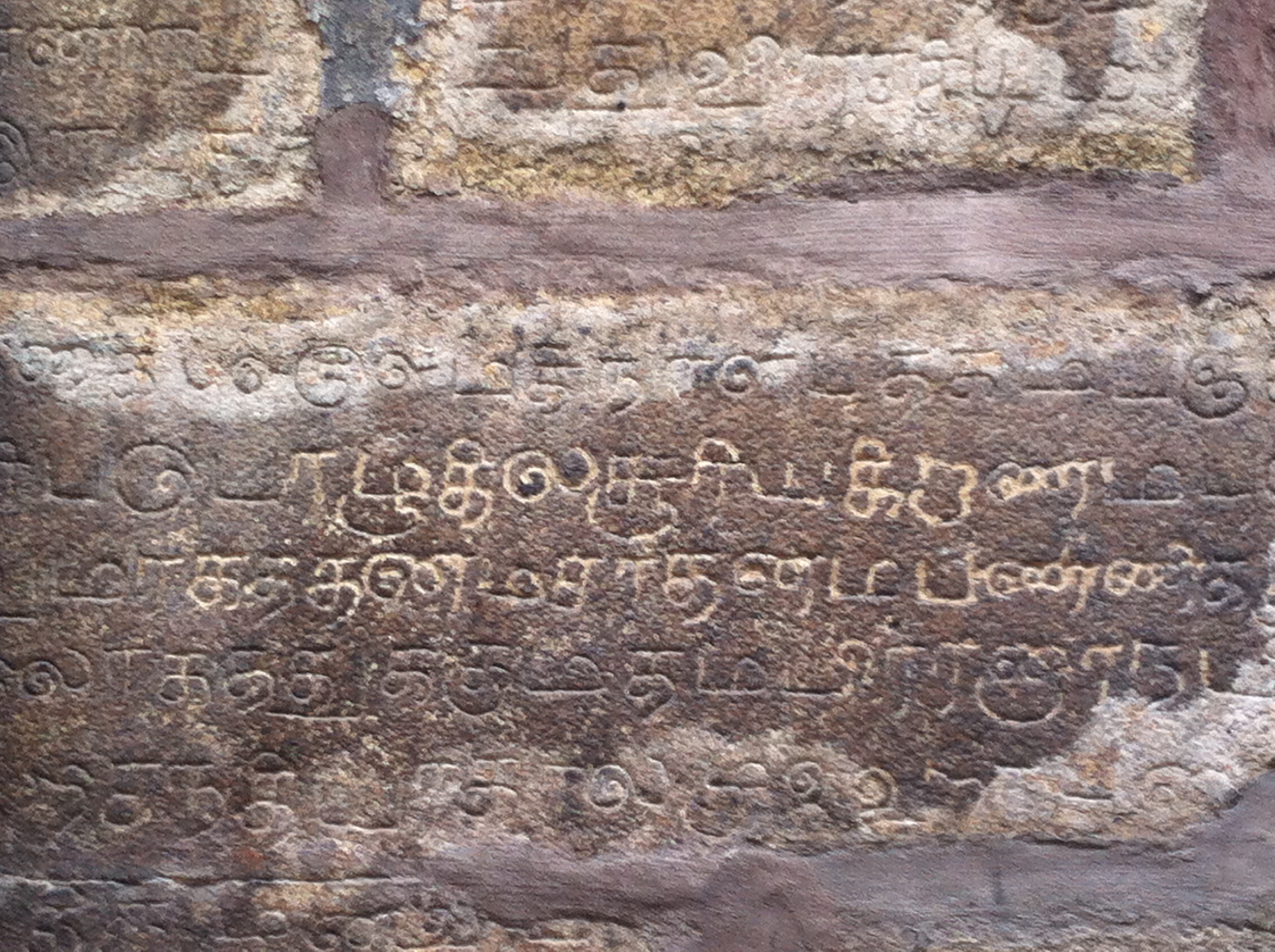
Tamil Inscriptions at Pazhani Temple

References to the place exist in ancient Tamil devotional texts. According to Hindu mythology, "Sage Narada once visited the celestial court of Shiva at Mount Kailash to present to Him a fruit, the jnana-palam (literally, the fruit of knowledge), that held in it the elixir of wisdom. Upon Shiva expressing his intention of dividing the fruit between his two sons, Ganesha and Murugan, the sage counselled against cutting it. He decided to award it to whoever of his two sons first circled the world thrice. Accepting the challenge, Murugan started his journey around the globe on his mount peacock. However, Ganesha, who surmised that the world was no more than his parents Shiva and Shakti combined, circumambulated them". Pleased with their son's discernment, Shiva awarded the fruit to Ganesha. When Murugan returned, he was furious to learn that his efforts had been in vain. He left Kailash and took up his abode in Palani hills in South India. It is believed that Murugan felt the need to get matured from boyhood and hence chose to remain as a hermit and discarded all his robes and ornaments. He went into meditation to know about himself.

Palani and most of Dindigul district were part of the Kongu Nadu region of the Tamil country. The northern part of the Palani and Oddanchatram taluks is held to have been part of the Anda Nadu sub-region, whereas the rest of the area constituted the Vaikapuri Nadu. The area was under the influence of the rulers of Coimbatore and Madurai, at various points of time. In the 18th century, Hyder Ali and his son, Tipu Sultan ruled over the place before being annexed the British after the Third Anglo-Mysore War.

== Temples ==
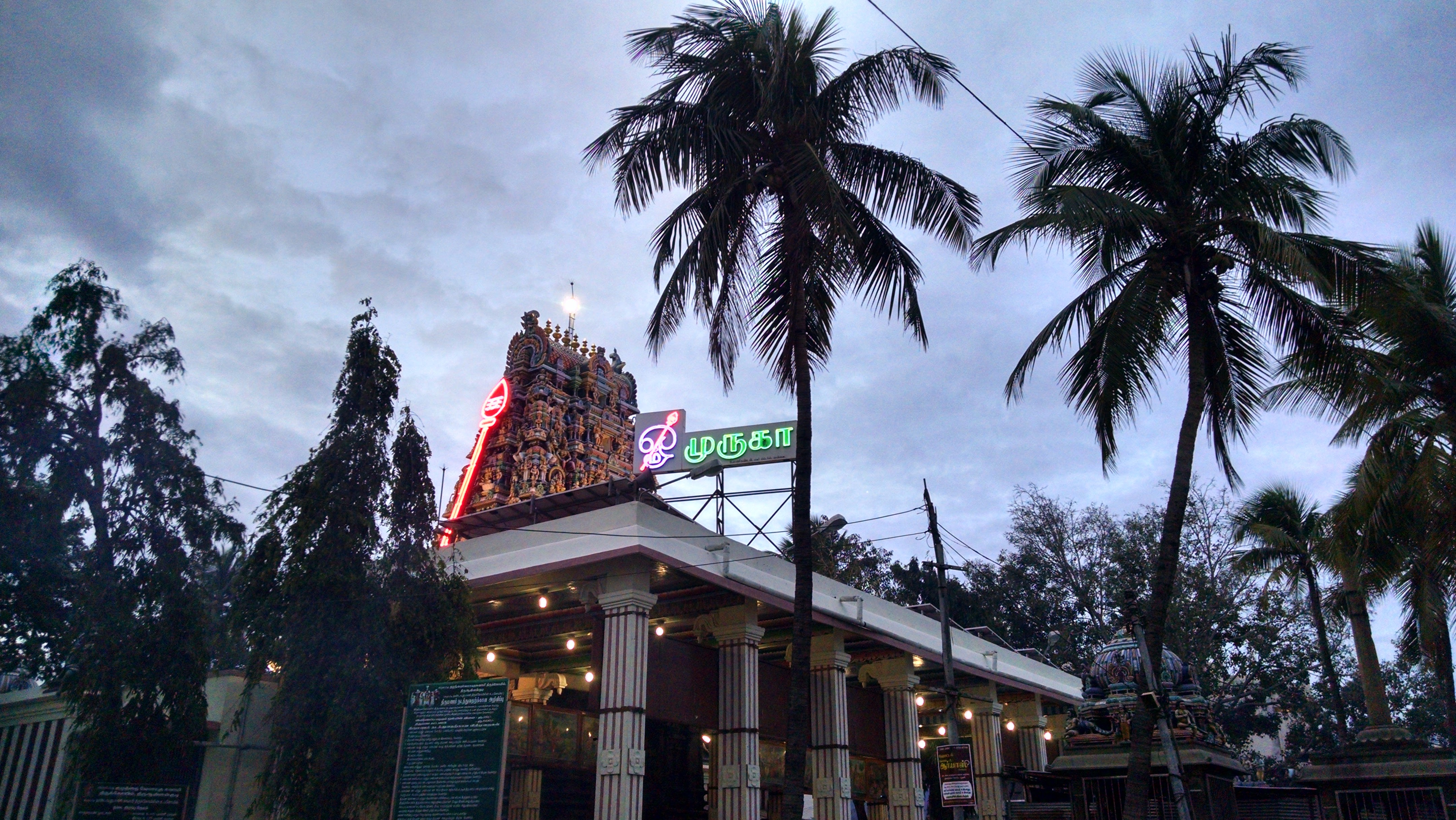
Thiru Avinan Kudi Temple

Palani is home to one of the most sacred shrines of the Murugan, as worshiped in the Hindu sect of Kaumaram. The Thandayudhapani Temple dedicated to Murugan "Palani Andavar", and regarded one of his Arupadai Veedu (Six Battle Camps), is situated here. The temple is situated atop a hill known as Sivagiri. The Garbagriham is surmounted by a gold gopuram and the walls of the Garbagriham have numerous stone inscriptions describing offerings made by devotees to the temple. Steps are hewn into the rock, besides a wide path meant for the ascent of elephants, up the hill. In addition, a winch pulled railway with three tracks and a rope way are operational. A temple is dedicated to Murugan near the foot of the hill by the name of Thiru Avinan kudi which actually forms a part of the six abodes of Murugan (Arupadaiveedu). It is also called as Kulandai Velayudhaswami Thirukkovil.

Besides this, right at the foot of the Sivagiri is a small shrine dedicated to the god Ganapathi, where he goes by the name Pada Vinayakar. It is customary amongst the pilgrims to pay their obeisances at this shrine before commencing their ascent of the hill.

Halfway up the hill, there is the Idumban shrine where every pilgrim is expected to offer obeisance to Idumban before entering the temple of Dandayudhapani. The practice of Pilgrims to Palani bringing their offerings on their shoulders in a kavadi is associated with the legend of Idumban.

Within the town is another temple dedicated to the Goddess Parvathi as Periyanayaki Amman. Near the Periya Nayaki Amman temple are two others – the Mariyamman Temple and the Perumal Temple. The former is particularly resorted to in times of epidemics, the goddess there being regarded as the protector against illnesses.

A short distance from the town is a temple dedicated to Shiva as Periya Avudaiyar.

The Kannadi Perumal Temple, dedicated to Vishnu, is a small temple situated on a hillock 9 km south of Palani, a short distance from the highway to Kodaikanal.

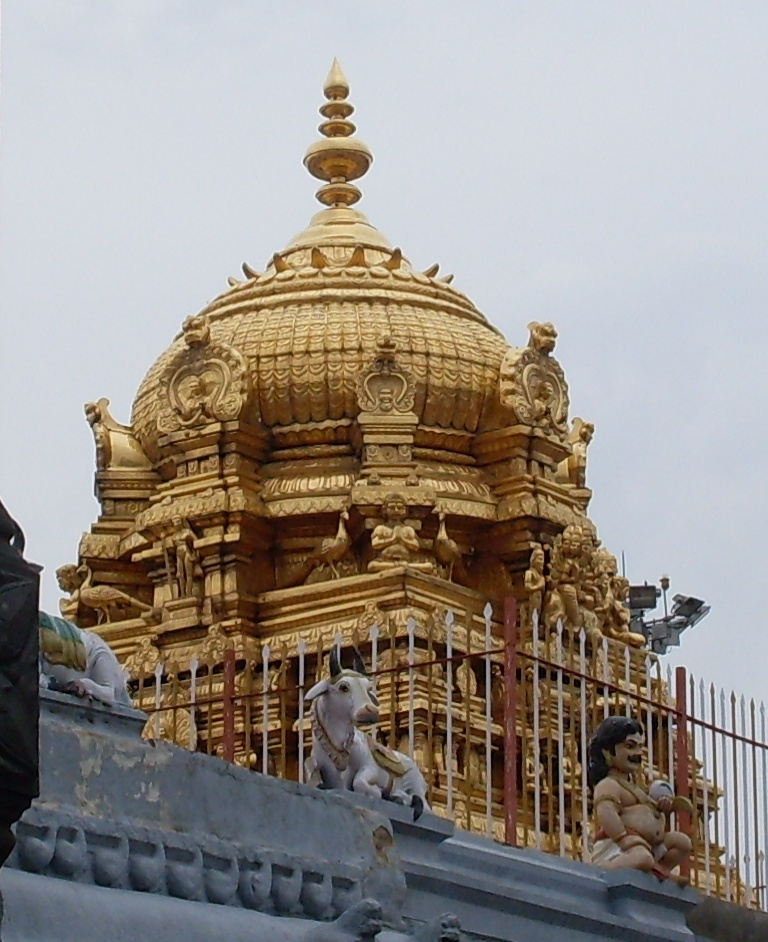
Gold plated Gopuram

== Geography ==
The backdrop to the town is formed by an offshoot of the Western Ghats, the Palani Hills, whereon lies the hill-station of Kodaikanal. The view within the town is dominated by the two hills, Sivagiri and Sakthigiri, on the former of which lies the temple. At the foot of the hills lie several lakes which drain to the Shanmuganathi river, a tributary of the Amaravathi River (itself a tributary of the Kaveri River), which takes its source on the slopes of the Palani Hills.
The nearest towns are Oddanchatram, Dharapuram, Udumalaipettai, Kodaikanal.

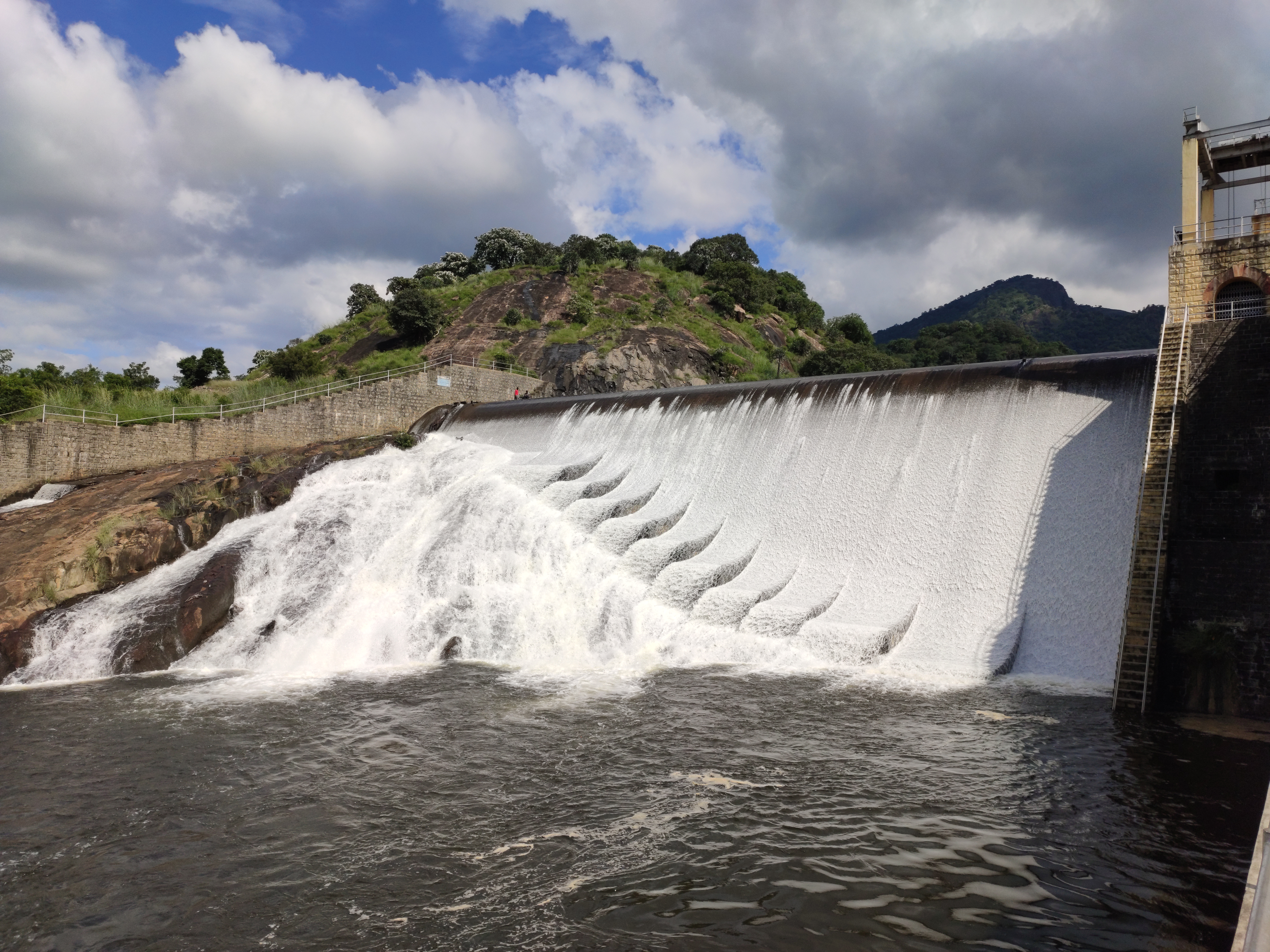
Varadhamanadhi Dam

== Demographics ==
According to 2011 census, Palani had a population of 292,301 with a sex-ratio of 1,023 females for every 1,000 males, much above the national average of 929. A total of 6,467 were under the age of six, constituting 3,283 males and 3,184 females. Scheduled Castes and Scheduled Tribes accounted for 16.57% and 0.23% of the population respectively. The average literacy of the town was 78.95%, compared to the national average of 72.99%. The town had a total of 19,015 households. There were a total of 27,150 workers, comprising 372 cultivators, 1,277 main agricultural labourers, 763 in house hold industries, 23,478 other workers, 1,260 marginal workers, 40 marginal cultivators, 68 marginal agricultural labourers, 107 marginal workers in household industries and 1,045 other marginal workers. As per the religious census of 2011, Palani had 90.58% Hindus, 7.63% Muslims, 1.44% Christians, 0.01% Sikhs, 0.01% Buddhists, 0.42% following other religions and 0.02% following no religion or did not indicate any religious preference.

Religious census
| Religion | Percent(%) |
| Hindu | 90.58% |
| Muslim | 7.63% |
| Christian | 1.44% |
| Other | 0.46% |

== Transportation ==
=== Roadway ===
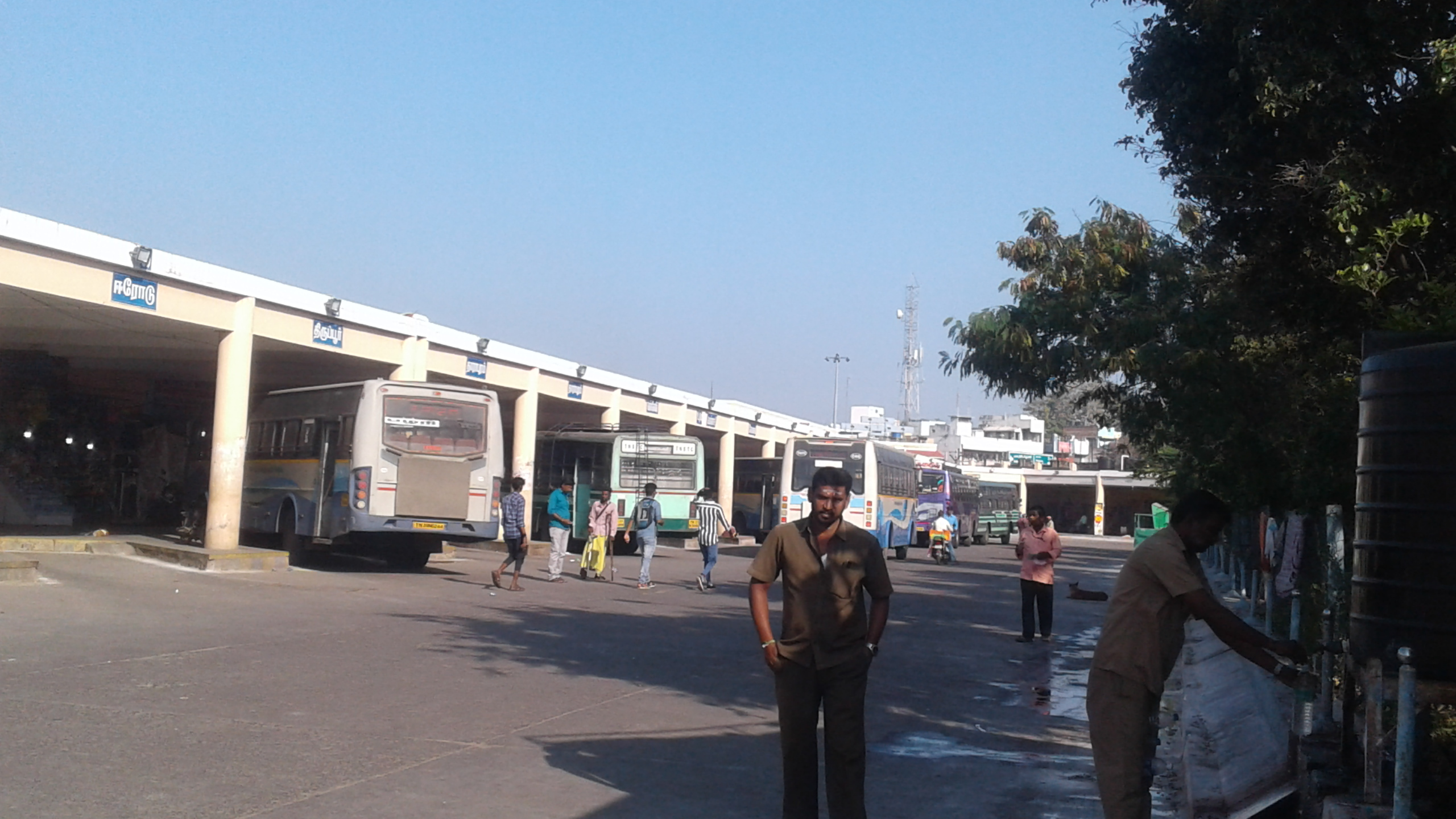
Central bus station, Palani

National Highway NH 83 connects Coimbatore to Nagapattinam via Palani Tiruchirappalli Thanjavur. Tamil Nadu State Transport Corporation Limited TNSTC buses connect the town to other parts of the state. KSRTC buses connecting places like Kottayam, Kozhikode, Kasaragod, Guruvayur, Ernakulam, Thrissur, Palakkad, and kottarakara are available at particular interval of time from Palani bus stand. 24 hours buses are available on all three main roads (via Dharapuram, Oddanchatram and Udumalaipettai)

=== Railway ===
Station Code :PLNI, Palani is a part of the Coimbatore-Rameswaram BG line prior to the commencing of gauge conversion. On 20 November 2012, the Dindigul-Palani section of the line was completed, and the local railway station opened to railway traffic again. Currently there are passenger trains are crossing from Madurai, Thiruchendur to Coimbatore, Palakkad. And a daily express train available between Palakkad Junction to Chennai. Recently Amritha express running from Rameswaram to Thiruvananthapuram via Madurai Junction, Dindigul, Palani, Pollachi, Palakkad, Thrissur, Ernakulam, Kottayam, Kollam.

=== Airway ===
The nearest major airports are Coimbatore International Airport located 100 kilometres (62 mi) from Palani and Madurai International Airport located at 130 kilometres (81 mi) from Palani. Tiruchirappalli International Airport is the next nearest, 164 km from Palani.

== See also ==
- Sacred mountains of India
- Kalthurai
- Palani (Lok Sabha constituency)
- Vibhuti
