= Archaeology in Tamil Nadu =

Archaeology in Tamil Nadu is mainly done under the supervision of Archaeological Survey of India and Tamil Nadu State Department of Archaeology. As of 2023, excavations have been done at 40 sites and 36 reports have been issued.

The excavated sites are as follows.

Excavations
S.No	PLACE OF EXCAVATION	DISTRICT	YEAR
1	Korkai	Tuticorin	1968 – 1969
2	Panchalankurichi	Tuticorin	1968 – 1969
3	Vasavasamudram	Kanchipuram	1969 – 1970
4	Anaimalai	Coimbatore	1969 – 1970
5	Pallavamedu	Kanchipuram	1970 – 1971
6	Karur	Karur	1973 – 1979, 1994 – 1995
7	Panayakulam	Dharmapuri	1979 – 1980
8	Booluvampatti|Boluvampatti	Coimbatore	1979 – 1980, 1980 – 1981
9	Kovalanpottal	Madurai	1980 – 1981
10	Thondi	Ramanathapuram	1980 – 1981
11	Gangaikonda Cholapuram	Ariyalur	1980 – 1981, 1986 – 1987, 2008 – 2009
12	Kannanur	Tiruchirappalli	1982 – 1983
13	Kurumbanmedu	Thanjavur	1984 – 1985
14	Palayarai	Thanjavur	1984 – 1985
15	Alagankulam	Ramanathapuram	1986 – 1987, 1990 – 1991, 1993 – 1994, 1995 – 1996, 1996 – 1997, 1997 – 1998, 2014 – 2015
16	Tirukkovilur	Villupuram	1992 – 1993
17	Kodumanal	Erode	1992 – 1993, 1996 – 1998
18	Sendamangalam	Villupuram	1992 – 1993, 1994 – 1995
19	Padavedu	Tiruvannamalai	1992 – 1993
20	Tiruttangal	Virudhunagar	1994 – 1995
21	Poompuhar	Mayiladuthurai	1994 – 1995, 1997 – 1998
22	Maligaimedu	Cuddalore	1999 – 2000
23	Tirunelveli	Ramanathapuram	1999 – 2000
24	Mangudi	Tirunelveli	2001 – 2002
25	Perur	Coimbatore	2001 –2002
26	Andipatti	Tiruvannamalai	2004 – 2005
27	Modur	Dharmapuri	2004 – 2005
28	Marakkanam	Villupuram	2005 – 2006
29	Parikulam	Thiruvallur	2005-06
30	Nedunkur	Karur	2006 – 2007
31	Mangulam	Madurai	2006 – 2007
32	Sembiankandiyur	Mayiladuthurai	2007 – 2008
33	Tranquebar	Mayiladuthurai	2008 – 2009
34	Rajakkalmangalam	Tirunelveli	2009 – 2010
35	Talaichankadu	Nagapattinam	2010 – 2011
36	Alambarai	Kancheepuram	2011 – 2012
37	Srirangam	Trichy	2013 – 2014, 2014 – 2015
38	Ukkaran Kottai	Tirunelveli	2014 – 2015
39	Pattaraiperumbudur	Tiruvallur	2015 – 2016
40	Keeladi	Sivagangai	2017 – 2018, 2018 – 2019, 2019 - 2020
41	Vembakottai (Kottai Medu)	Virudhunagar	2022 – 2023
42	Perumbalai	Dharmapuri	2022
43	Thulukkarpatti		
44	Chennanur	Krishnagiri	2024

== List of District Archaeological Site Museums ==
List of District Archaeological Site Museums
S. No.	Name	Place
1	Marine Archaeological Site Museum	Poompuhar
2.	Danish Fort Site Museum	Tharangambadi formerly Tranquebar
3.	Coimbatore Site Museum	Coimbatore
4.	Hero Stones Site Museum	Dharmapuri
5.	Chera Site Museum	Karur
6.	Courtalam Site Museum	Tirunelveli
7.	Rajarajan Site Museum	Thanjavur
8.	Maratta Site Museum	Thanjavur
9.	Tirumalai Nayak Mahal Site Museum	Madurai
10.	Pre-Historic Site Museum	Tiruvallur
11.	Islamic Site Museum	Vellore
12.	Ramalinga Vilasam Site Museum	Ramanathapuram
13.	Rajendracholan Site Museum	Mayiladuthurai
14.	Tirukkoilur Site Museum	Tirukoilur
15.	Vembakottai Site Museum	Vembakottai
