= Keelnamandi archaeological site =

Keelnamandi archaeological site is located in the Keelnamandi Panchayat of the Vandavasi Union in the Tiruvannamalai district, Southern India.

Excavations were carried out at the site by the Tamil Nadu Department of Archaeology during 2022 and 2024. Based on the artifacts unearthed during the excavation, the site has been dated to the Iron Age.

Burial urns and black and red ware pottery were discovered during the excavation in year 2023 over an area of 55 acres at a cost of 30 lakhs Indian rupees.

== Period ==
Analysis of the organic materials found during the excavation has revealed that the site dates back to the 17th century BCE.

== See also ==
- Arikamedu
- Adichanallur archaeological site
- Kodumanal
- Keezhadi excavation site
