= Keezhadi =

Neighbourhood in Sivaganga district, Tamil Nadu, India

- Village
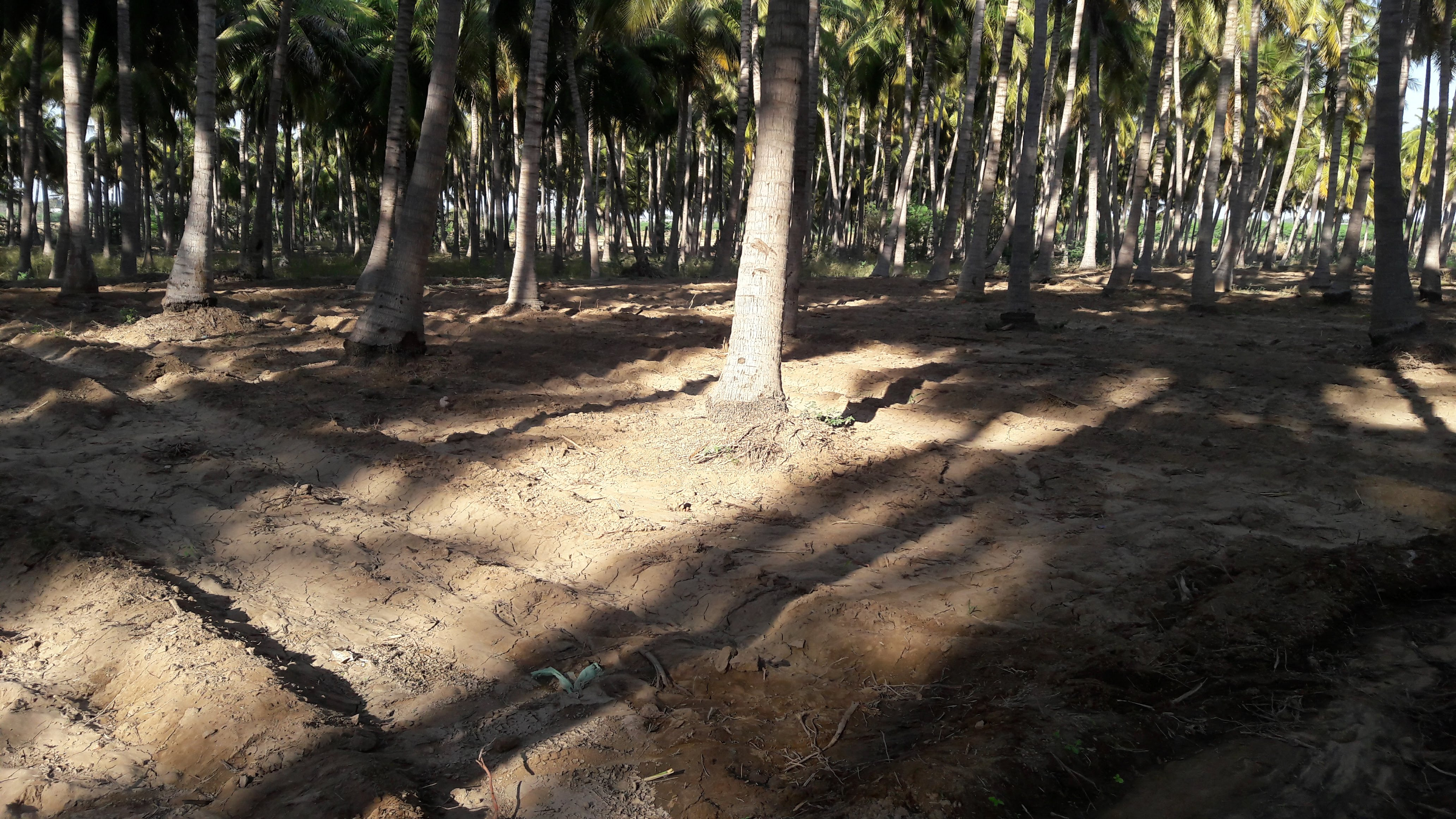
- Archaeological site

- Location in Tamil Nadu, India Keezhadi (Tamil Nadu)
- Coordinates: 9.8630727°N 78.1820931°E
- Country: India
- State: Tamil Nadu
- District: Sivagangai
- Taluk: Manamadurai

Government
  - Type: Manamadurai Municipality
  - Body: Village Panchayat
  - Panchayat Head: V Venkatasubramanian
- Elevation: 123 m (404 ft)

Population (2011)
  - Total: 5,140
- Time zone: UTC+5:30 (IST)
- PIN: 630611
- Telephone code: 04574
- Vehicle registration: TN 63(Sivaganga RTO)
- Assembly constituency: Manamadurai
- Lok Sabha constituency: Sivagangai

Keezhadi, also spelt Keeladi (Tamil: [kiːɻaɖi], ISO: Kīḻaṭi), is a village near the village of Silaiman, under the control of Manamadurai Municipalilty, situated on the border between Madurai and Sivagangai districts, in Tamil Nadu, India. The Keezhadi excavation site is located in this area. Excavations carried out by the Archaeological Survey of India (ASI) and the Tamil Nadu Archaeology Department (TNAD) have revealed a Sangam era settlement dated to the 6th century BCE by radiocarbon dating. Claims that the results show that there was writing at that time have been challenged. It is not clear whether the potsherds containing inscriptions were found in the same archaeological layer as the 6th century samples, and University of Calcutta archaeologist Bishnupriya Basak said that "This unfortunately is not clear from the report and is very crucial", adding that the issues of "layer, period and absolute dates" needed clarity. Dravidian University archaeologist E. Harsha Vardhan said that a single report was not enough to "state scientifically that the Tamil-Brahmi script belongs to the sixth century BC".

== Excavations ==
An archaeological survey team under Archaeologist Amarnath Ramakrishna was first conducted in 2013 in the vicinity of the Vaigai river from Theni district to Ramanathapuram district where the river meets the sea. During the study, 293 sites, including Keezhadi, were identified to have archaeological residues. The first three phases of excavation at Keezhadi were conducted by the Archaeological Survey of India, and they dropped it from doing further research. A public interest litigation was filed and following that the court ordered the regional depart to carry forward, following which the fourth and fifth phases were conducted by the Tamil Nadu Archaeology Department.

== Carbon nanomaterials in Keezhadi pottery ==
A team of researchers identified pottery shards at Keezhadi that contain carbon nanomaterials, including single-walled and multi-walled carbon nanotubes.

== Keezhadi Heritage Museum ==
Keezhadi Heritage museum was inaugurated by Tamil Nadu Chief Minister M.K. Stalin on 5 March 2023 in Sivaganga, close to the historic archaeological site which was discovered in 2014. The museum has been established at a cost of ₹18.42 crore across 31,000 square feet of land. Built in a Karaikudi based traditional Chettinad style, the architecture displays artefacts and antiquities excavated from the site since 2017 in the present-day Sivaganga district by the Tamil Nadu State Department of Archaeology. On display would be artefacts like dice made of ivory and terracotta, male and female figurines made of terracotta, iron dagger, and punch-mark coins. The museum will also display replicas of the trenches and some of the urns that were unearthed in Konthagai, believed to be the burial site of inhabitants of Keezhadi. The museum has six display halls – only ground floor in three, two with mezzanine floors and one with mezzanine and first floor – and an auditorium where visitors will be treated to documentaries on excavations in Keezhadi and their significance.

== Transport ==
=== Air ===
Nearest airport to Keezhadi is Madurai International Airport, 15.2 km away.

=== Rail ===
Nearest railhead is Silaiman Railway Station, 2.7 km away. Nearest major railhead is Madurai Junction Railway Station 13.4 km away.

== See also ==
- Manamadurai
- Sivaganga
- Madurai
- History of Tamil Nadu
