= Tamizh Selvan =

- Poster
- Directed by: Bharathiraja
- Screenplay by: Bharathiraja
- Story by: M. Rathnakumar
- Produced by: M. Ramanathan
- Starring: Vijayakanth; Roja
- Cinematography: B. Kannan
- Edited by: K. Pazhanivel
- Music by: Deva
- Production company: Raaj Films International
- Release date: 2 August 1996
- Running time: 152 minutes
- Country: India
- Language: Tamil

Tamizh Selvan (pronounced [tamiɻselʋan]) is a 1996 Indian Tamil-language political drama film directed by Bharathiraja from a story by M. Rathnakumar. The films stars Vijayakanth and Roja. It was released on 2 August 1996, and failed at the box office.

== Plot ==
Tamizh Selvan IAS starts as an assistant collector in Chennai. He is insulted by the corrupt collector because of his helpful and honest nature and skin colour, but he does not give a budge and within a span becomes the chief collector in the city. He marries a research scholar Fathima and is assisted by Manuneethi Chozhan. A rebellious group leader initially opposes Tamizh Selvan since he had helped the police arrest one of their members. The group protests against their unfair and undue treatment in politician Vedimuthu's illegal quarry but since he hears their problems and solves it he is heralded as a hero by masses. This irks Vedimuthu and other politicians who do not want Tamizh Selvan to prosper. How Tamizh Selvan resists the politicians' attempts to damage his reputation forms the crux of the story.

== Cast ==
- Vijayakanth as Tamizh Selvan IAS
- Roja as Fathima
- Manivannan as Vedimuthu
- Vadivelu as Manuneethi Sozhan
- Santhana Bharathi
- Malaysia Vasudevan
- Periyar Dasan
- Thalaivasal Vijay as the rebellious group leader
- Mohan Raman as the corrupt collector
- Baby Hemalatha
- Madhan Bob (uncredited)

== Production ==
R. Selvaraj wrote a story titled Vaakkapatta Bhoomi (transl. The promised land), with the intention of making it a film produced by himself, and Bharathiraja was assigned to direct, but the project did not materialise. Later, M. Ramanathan of Raaj Films International heard that Selvaraj had the call-sheets of Bharathiraja and Vijayakanth ready and offered to produce any film with both involved. Bharathiraja and Vijayakanth agreed, and the film was Tamizh Selvan.

The first shot Bharathiraja directed was Vijayakanth smiling which he shot at Shivanasamudra Falls, Karnataka. During a filming schedule at Kollegal, politician Vatal Nagaraj objected to the clapperboard used being in Tamil but left after being intimidated by Vijayakanth. To avoid further trouble, Bharathiraja offered to remove the name Tamizh Selvan from the clapperboard, but Vijayakanth threatened to quit the film if that happened. Another scene was shot at the T. Nagar Social Club, Chennai. Historian R. Balakrishnan revealed that he was unsuccessfully offered to act in the film. For a scene in which Mohan Raman's character yells at Vijayakanth's character in English, Bharathiraja let the actor improvise his lines.

== Soundtrack ==
The music was composed by Deva.

Track listing
No.	Title	Lyrics	Singer(s)	Length
1.	"Aasa Kepakali"	Vaali	K. S. Chithra, P. Unnikrishnan	5:13
2.	"Hawa Hawa"	Vairamuthu	Mano	4:26
3.	"Rajasthanu"	Vairamuthu	Swarnalatha, Mano	4:33
4.	"Rendu Kannu"	Vairamuthu	Krishnaraj, Swarnalatha	5:25
5.	"Unnal Mudiyum"	Vairamuthu	S. P. Balasubrahmanyam	5:02
Total length:				24:39

== Critical reception ==
R. P. R. of Kalki praised Vijayakanth's performance, Bharathiraja's direction and Deva's background score. K. N. Vijiyan of New Straits Times wrote "Bharathirajaa takes the story along smoothly and maintains our interest until the end. But a few scenes were disjointed and I have a feeling this had something to do with our censors". D. S. Ramanujam of The Hindu wrote, "The role of bureaucrats in correcting and exposing corrupt and wayward politicians in power is the theme veteran director Bharathiraaja has handled with his known flourish". He added, "Rathnakumar's story base has already found exposure in earlier movies of this genre. But his dialogue is interestingly amusing particularly in areas".
