= K. Amarnath Ramakrishna =

Indian archaeologist

- Born: Palani, Tamil Nadu, India
- Education: Pandit Deendayal Upadhyaya Institute of Archaeology, New Delhi
- Occupation: Archaeologist
- Known for: Keezhadi Excavation, Near Madurai

K. Amarnath Ramakrishna is an Indian archaeologist. He is noted for his research into the Keeladi excavation site, a Sangam period settlement in Tamil Nadu. Ramakrishna also worked in Kondapur and Nagarjunakonda museums.

== See also ==
- Archaeological Survey of India
- Tamil Nadu Archaeology Department
- Keezhadi
