= Porunai Museum =

Public museum in Tamil Nadu, India

Coordinates: 8.677°N 77.756°E

Porunai Museum is an institution established by the Government of Tamil Nadu in Reddiarpatti, Tirunelveli district, to showcase the state's 3,200-year-old ancient civilization to the world. The museum houses archaeological artifacts unearthed during excavations along the banks of the Thamirabarani River, including sites like Sivakalai, Adichanallur and Korkai. Built at an estimated cost of ₹56.36 crore, the museum was inaugurated by the chief minister of Tamil Nadu, M. K. Stalin, on December 20, 2025. Spanning an area of approximately 13 acres, the museum complex features an reception hall and seven building blocks covering 54,296 square feet. These blocks display archaeological remains and artifacts recovered from Sivakalai, Adichanallur, and Korkai.
