= Silaiman =

- village
- Location in Tamil Nadu, India
- Coordinates: 9°52′23.2″N 78°11′52.1″E
- Country: India
- State: Tamil Nadu
- District: Madurai
- Mandal: Tirupparankunram (Thiruparankundram)

Government
  - Body: Gram panchayat
- Elevation: 144 m (472 ft)

Population (2011)
  - Total: 6,436
- Time zone: UTC+5:30 (IST)
- PIN: 625201

Silaiman is a panchayat village in Tirupparankunram Mandal (Thiruparankundram) of Madurai District in the Tamil-Nadu state of India. Silaiman is located on the right (south) bank of the Vaigai River, on Route 85 about eight kilometers by road southeast of the city of Madurai, the district headquarters. It is very near to the Keeladi excavation site. Dice made of elephant trunk, ear rings, and thongattan made of gold are examples of the important materials excavated and collected from this site and deposited in Mysore museum. The Tamil Nadu government is taking steps to establish archaeological museums in and around Keeladi village to preserve this kind of material within Tamil Nadu. In the 2011 census the population was 6,436.
