= Keezhadi excavation site =

Archaeological site in Tamil Nadu, India

- Vaigai valley civilisation
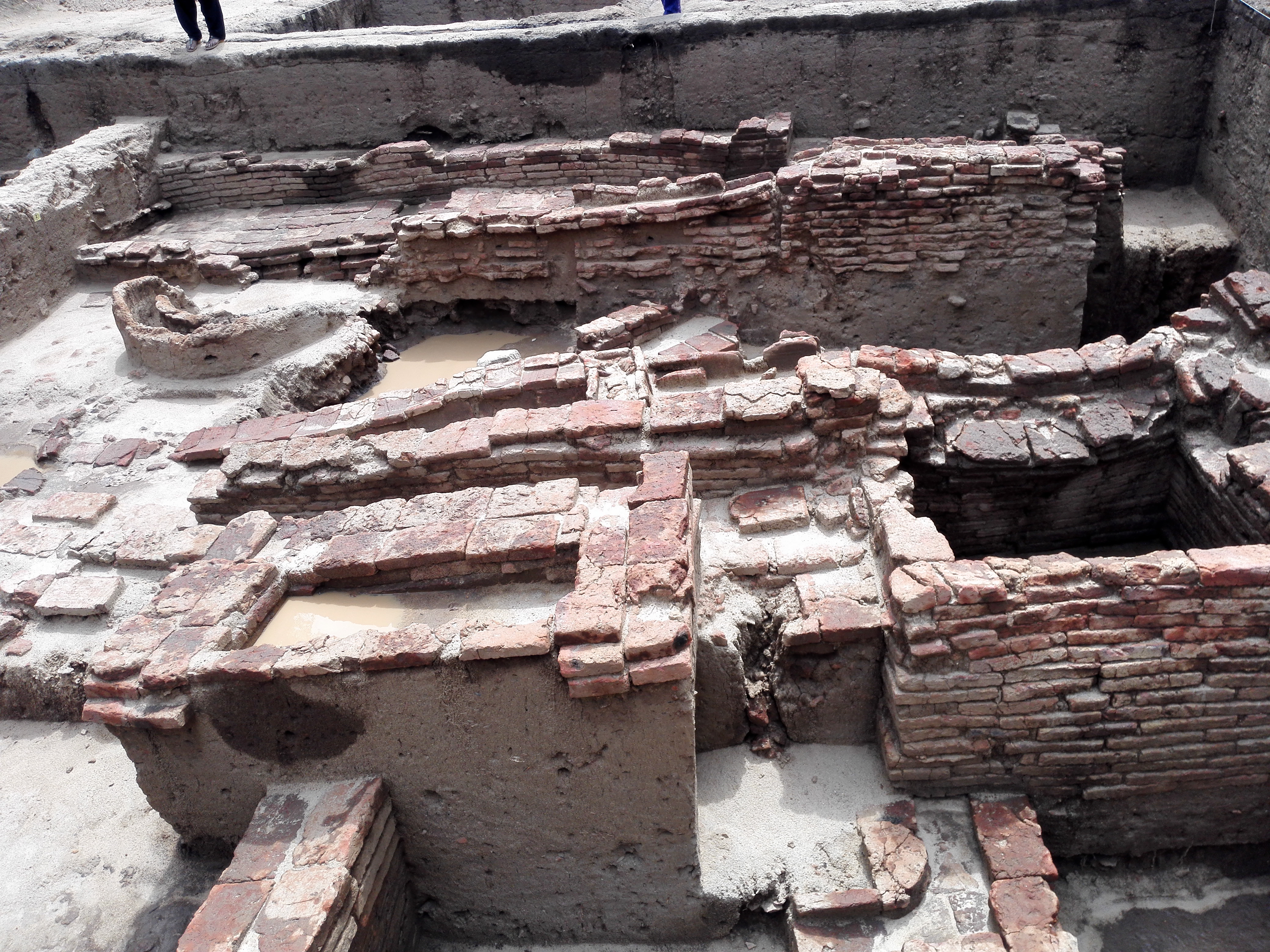
- Excavation blocks at Keezhadi

- Location within Tamil Nadu Location within India
- 9.8630727°N 78.1820931°E
- Type: Settlement
- Cultures: Sangam period
- Location: Keezhadi, Tamil Nadu, India
- Region: Thiruppuvanam, Sivaganga

History
- Built: c.600 BCE – 200 BCE

Site notes
- Area: 32.37 ha (80.0 acres)
- Excavation dates: 2015–present
- Archaeologists: Amarnath Ramakrishna
- Management: Archaeological Survey of India, Tamil Nadu Archaeology Department
- Public access: Yes

Keezhadi, or Keeladi (Tamil: [kiːɻaɖi], ISO: Kīḻaṭi), is a Sangam period settlement site, where excavation is being carried out by the Archaeological Survey of India (ASI) and the Tamil Nadu State Department of Archaeology. This site is located near the town of Keezhadi in Sivaganga district, Tamil Nadu, about 12 km southeast of Madurai. The settlement lies on the bank of the Vaigai River and reflects the ancient culture of Tamil Nadu. Epigraphist V. Vedachalam, who served as a domain expert for the excavation, dated the excavated remains between 6th century BCE and 3rd century BCE. However, the claimed dating of Tamil-Brahmi potsherd inscriptions to pre-3rd century BCE has been questioned due to lack of detailed information in published reports, and because of disturbances in the stratigraphy of the site — with many potsherds retrieved from mixed contexts of an ancient rubbish-dump cut as a large pit into deeper, older layers — making it doubtful whether any Tamil-Brahmi findings were from the same age as the dated charcoal samples, and the site remained occupied until the first century CE.

== Location ==
The excavation was first started in Pallichanthai Thidal, north of Manalur, about a kilometre east of Keezhadi. Various archaeological residues were found when ploughing the land around the site. A survey was conducted for the study, which found that this ancient settlement was less than two and a half meters below the ground level. The area currently being excavated is spread over 80 acres within a 3.5 km radius. The ancient towns of Kondagai and Manalur are also part of this region.

== Dating of site ==
Initially, this site was estimated to be from the period between 5th century BCE and 3rd century CE. Two samples were sent for carbon dating from this excavation site in 2017. The results in July 2017 confirmed that the samples were from about 2,200 years ago (3rd century BCE). Radiocarbon dating of samples obtained from the fourth phase of excavation revealed that one of the artifacts was from 6th century BCE. In 2017, the ASI sent two samples from Keezhadi to Beta Analytic, a Miami-based radiocarbon dating laboratory. The lab dated the samples to be about 2,300 – 2600 years old (from 3rd century BCE). In 2018, six carbon samples collected from the fourth phase of excavation were sent to Beta Analytic for Accelerator Mass Spectrometry (AMS) dating. It was found that one sample collected at a depth of 353 cm goes back to 580 BCE.

== Background and status of study ==
An archaeological survey was first conducted in 2013, by Archaeological Survey of India, in the vicinity of the Vaigai river from Theni district to Ramanathapuram district where the river meets the sea. During the study, 293 sites, including Keezhadi, were identified to have archaeological residues. The first three phases of excavation at Keezhadi were conducted by the Archaeological Survey of India while the phases after that were conducted by the Tamil Nadu Archaeology Department.

=== Phases of Keezhadi excavation ===
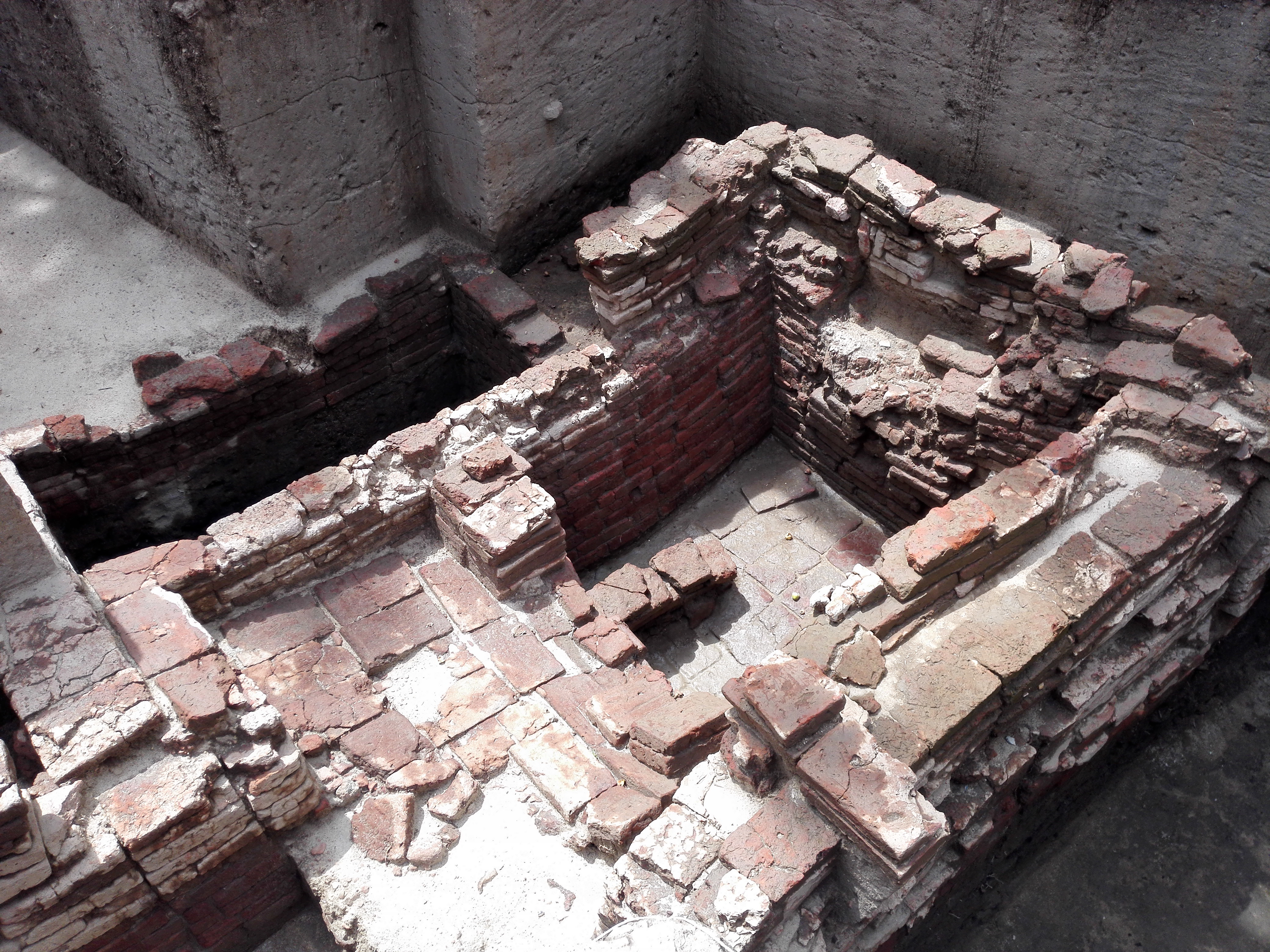
Archaeological remains from Keezhadi excavation site.

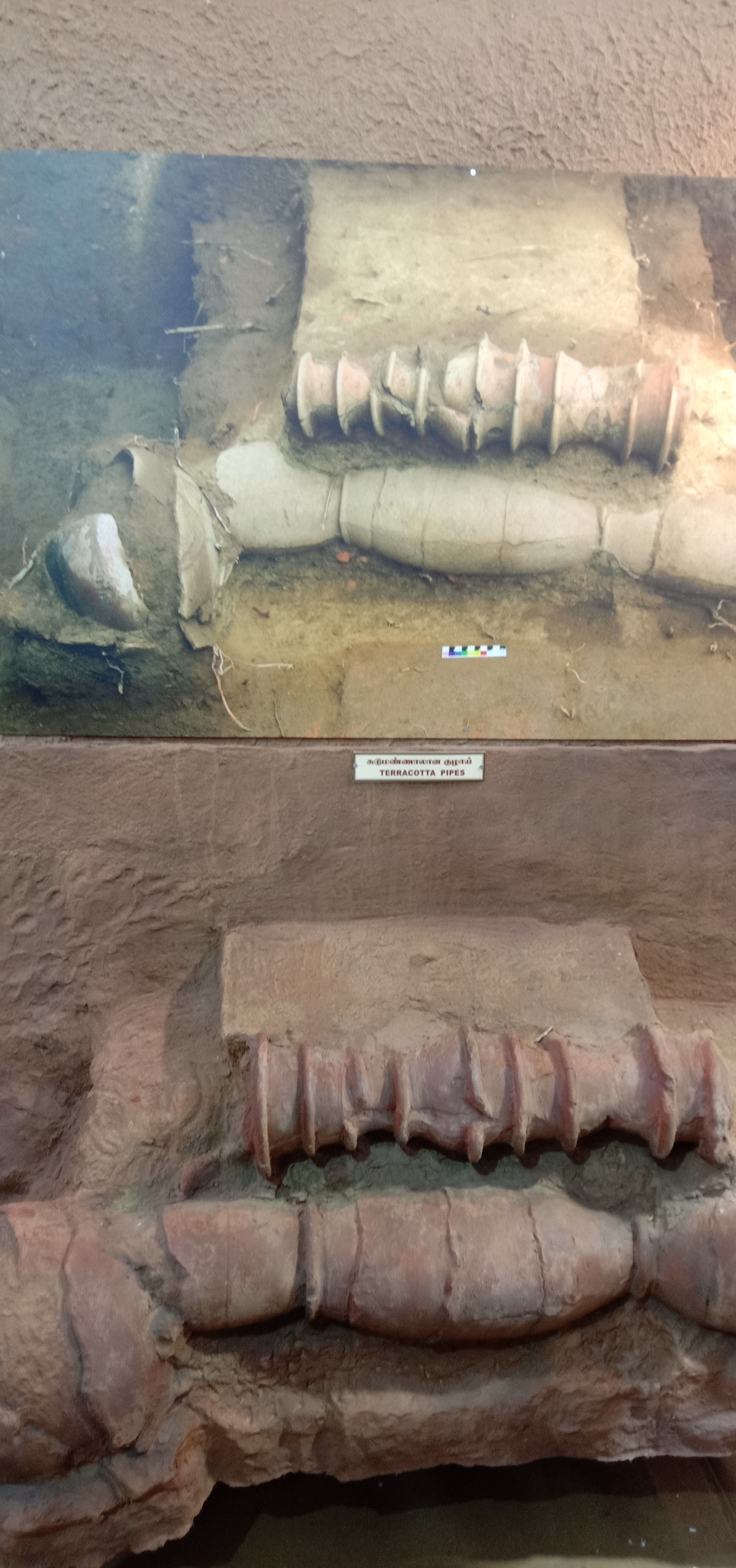
Archaeological remains from fifth phase excavation.

==== First phase ====
In June 2015, an Archaeological Survey of India group led by Amarnath Ramakrishnan started the first phase of the excavation in the area near the Vaigai river in Keezhadi.

==== Second phase ====
The second phase began on 2 January 2016. Various documents, including medical jars, antique kitchen wells, and factory and government seals, were found. At the end of the second phase, more than six thousand artifacts were found. It was confirmed that these artifacts were 2,200 years old when they were tested by radiocarbon dating.

==== Third phase ====
The third phase of the excavation was conducted under the chairmanship of Sri Ramanan of the Archaeological Survey of India from January 2017. The work ended on 30 September 2017. In the third phase, 16 digging sites were selected, covering a total area of 400 square meters, which is 80 acres of land.

==== Fourth phase ====
The fourth phase of the excavation was conducted between 2017 and 2018, bringing out 5,820 artifacts. Work in this phase was conducted by the Tamil Nadu Archaeology Department. Six carbon samples collected from the fourth phase of excavation were sent to Beta Analytic, Miami, Florida, USA for Accelerator Mass Spectrometry (AMS) dating; samples collected at a depth of 353 cm, were dated between 580 BCE and the 1st century CE. The graffiti marks on the artifacts obtained from the excavation site were said to be similar to the Indus script by the excavators. Bisnupriya Basak questioned whether the sherds actually came from the same level that was dated to the 6th century BCE. Some of the marks might have been made during the pottery-making process. Archaeologist E. Harsha Vardhan commented that “we cannot state scientifically that the Tamil-Brahmi script belongs to the sixth century BC” on the basis of this report.

==== Fifth phase ====
In June 2019, the Tamil Nadu Archaeology Department began the fifth phase of excavation led by Dr R Sivanantham. This phase was completed in four to five months in which 15 trenches was planned to be dug. In this stage, Sangam-era bricks and more than 700 objects were found and these have been sent for testing. As of 2020, the preliminary report of the fifth phase of excavations was nearing completion.

==== Seventh phase ====
The seventh phase was launched on 13 February and began on 19 February 2021. A 2600-year old damaged clay lid, Tamil-Brahmi inscribed potsherds, bone tip tools, terracotta spheres, and copper needles were found in this phase. It came to an end on 20 September 2021.

==== Eighth Phase ====
On 11 February 2022, the eighth phase of excavations began. Major findings were Ivory gamesman, Iron knife, antimony rod, and copper pendants in this phase.

==== Ninth Phase ====
The ninth phase commenced on 6 April 2023 and was completed in six months. Major findings in this phase were weighing units made of crystal quartz, a snake figurine made of terracotta, 26 burial urns, with carnelian beads in one of the burial urns. Around 183 antiquities were found including copper coins, and hopscotch pieces.

==== Tenth Phase ====
The tenth phase of excavation began on 18 June 2024. So far, the major findings are the identification of six terracotta pipelines in Keezhadi.

== Findings ==
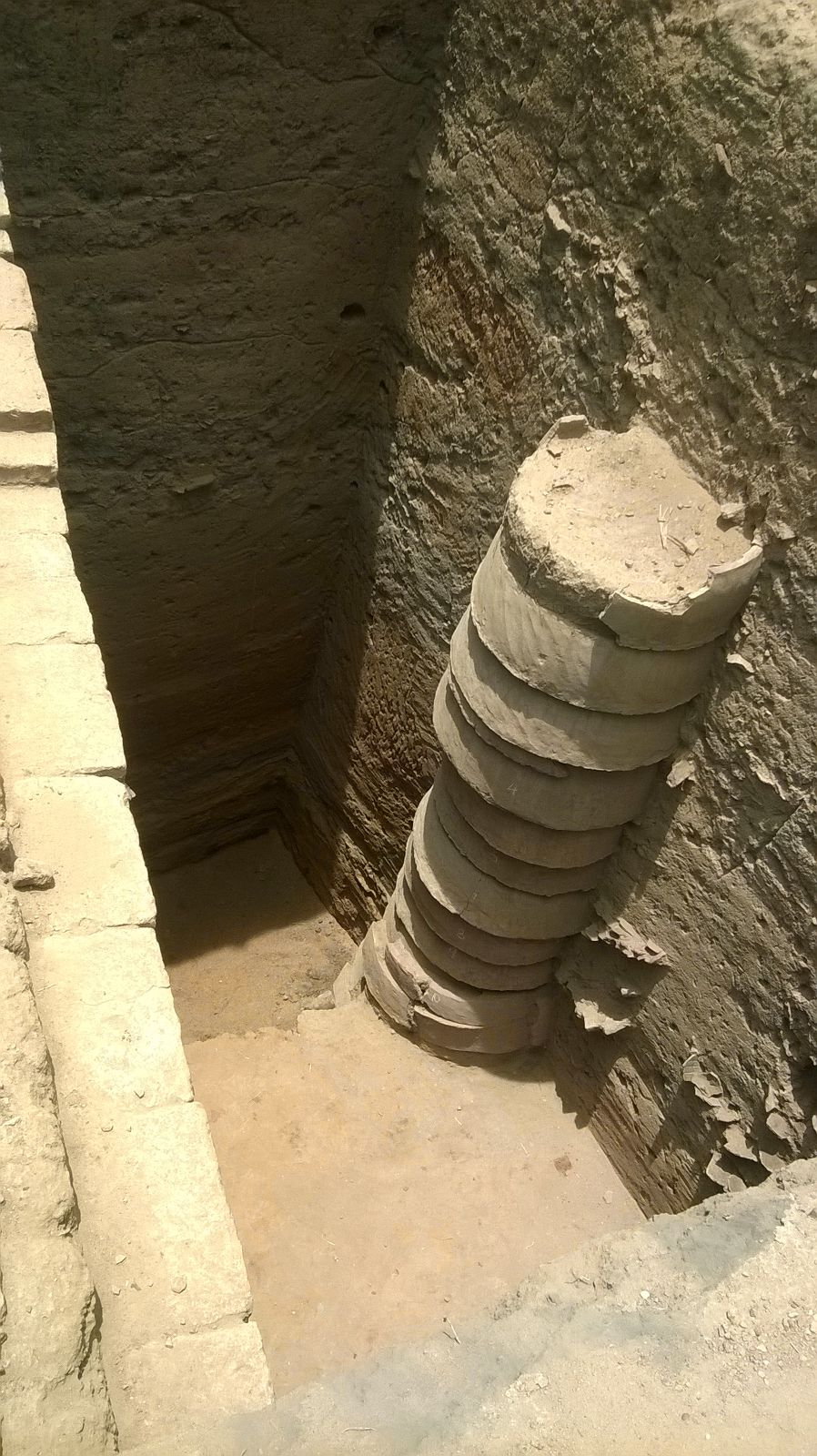
Brick wall found in the excavation.

Almost 48 square pits have been cut and various structures and artifacts have been found, including frosts, brick walls, roof tiles, pottery, mimic accessories, skeletal tools, iron Vel, and Tamil-Brahmi letter-etched plates. This place is considered to be Pandyan dynasty's city called "Perumanalur", the pioneer of literature. The use of fired brick, the size of the building complex, an array of pots placed in such a way that it must have been used either as a lamp or for painting, and other findings suggest that the settlement is of a more civilised population than was previously suspected during the Sangam period.

=== Ring wells and brick walls ===
Ancient earthenware and ring wells have been found. Archaeologist Velappan said that this proves the ancient tradition of Tamils indicating that they used these wells in river shores and ponds for water. Brick buildings are considered rare in ancient times but a large number of brick buildings have been found.

=== Pottery ===
Ceramic types like Black-and-Red ware, Black ware, Black Polished ware and Red ware were found. Analysis of the Black-and-Red ware pottery revealed that the reason for its black colour is due to the use of carbon material and hematite was used for the red colour. Pottery was fired in kilns at the temperature to 1100 °C to produce the typical Black-and-Red ware pottery. The rouletted, arretine-type ceramics brought by merchants demonstrate business connections during Indo-Roman trade. There are Tamil words engraved on the potteries that mention the names of individuals like 'Aathan', 'Uthiran' and 'Thiesan'.

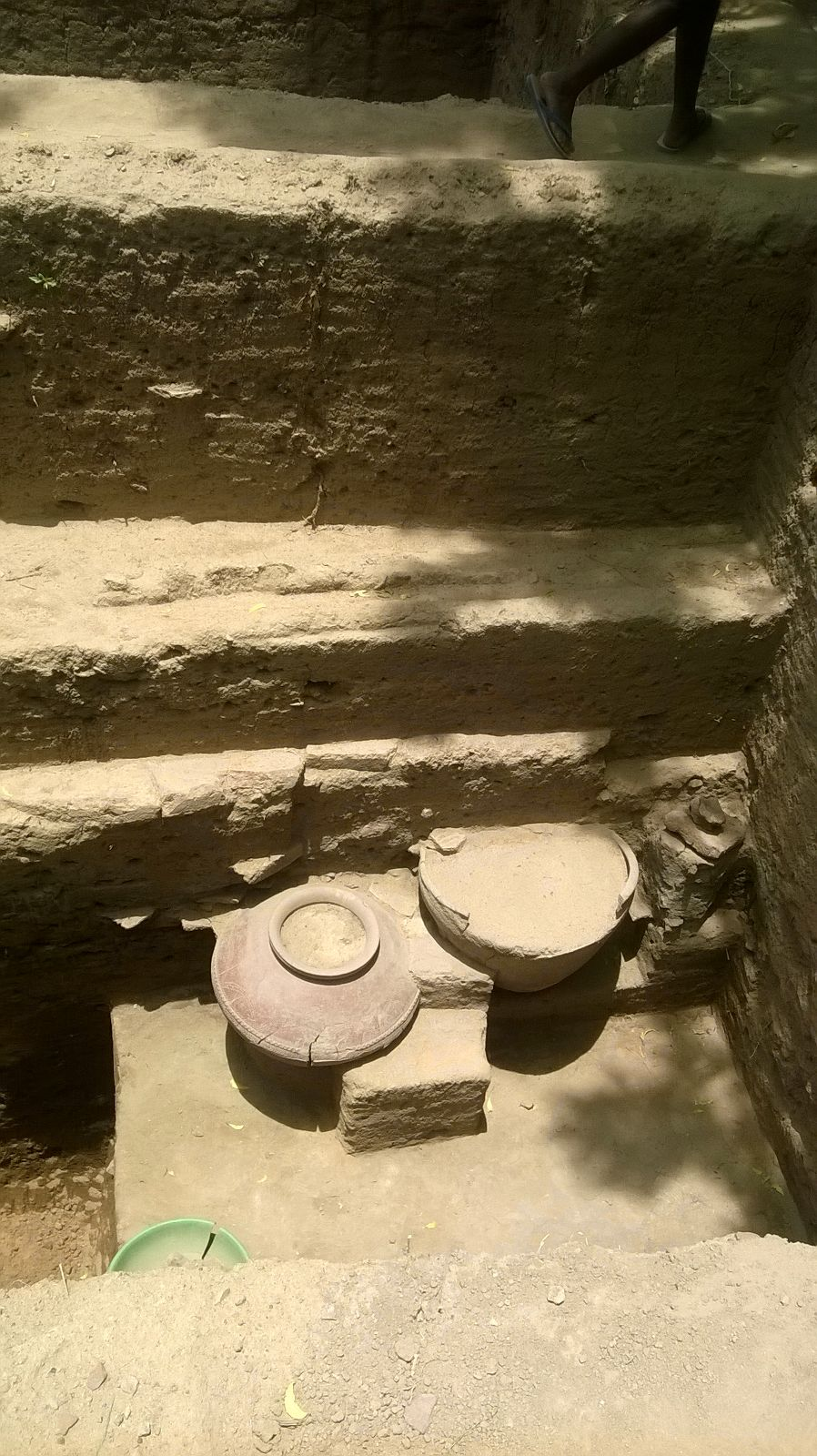
Pottery

=== Tamil-Brahmi script and graffiti marks ===
In the fourth phase of excavations at Keezhadi, 72 potsherds with Tamil-Brahmi script were discovered at the site. Some of these artifacts have inscribed graffiti marks, similar to graffiti marks which some believe to have evolved from the Indus script. According to T. Udhayachandran, the artifacts found at Keezhadi excavation site may point to a link between the scripts of the Indus Valley Civilisation and Tamil-Brahmi. Based on these marks, and one Keezhadi findings of the fourth phase which was dated to 580 BCE, R. Sivanantham and M. Seran argue that the date of the earliest attestation of Tamil-Brahmi can be pushed back to the 6th century BCE, a few centuries older than Dhamma Lipi (Prakrit in the Brahmi Script) of Ashokan Edicts, which is stated to be dated from 268 BC to 232 BC. These claims have been challenged. It is not clear whether the potsherds containing inscriptions were found in the same archaeological layer as the 6th century samples, and University of Calcutta archaeologist Bishnupriya Basak said that "This unfortunately is not clear from the report and is very crucial," adding that the issues of "layer, period and absolute dates" needed clarity. Dravidian University archaeologist E. Harsha Vardhan said that a single report was not enough to "state scientifically that the Tamil-Brahmi script belongs to the sixth century BC”.

Out of the "cartloads of potsherds" found at the site, only two of the Tamil-Brahmi inscriptions were figured in detail in the published report (p. 14) and were readable as complete words, but with "absolutely no indication in the book about the level at which these bits were found" nor "any information on the distance at which the carbon-dated charcoal were located from them." Especially complicating the uncertainties is the fact that Keezhadi is not an undisturbed site— which makes it difficult to use the principles of archaeological stratigraphy to corroborate the carbon-dated samples of charcoal bits to any other artifacts found during the digs. In particular, it was indicated by the excavation report that "huge amount of discarded potsherds" from Trench A3/2 were retrieved from the context of a refuse-dump which had been dug as a pit into the older-deposited strata, therefore mixing garbaged materials of different ages: even the "lowest level of deposit" was containing evidence of 6th to 3rd centuries BCE, with continued occupation until the first century CE.

=== Ornaments and antiquities ===
Ornaments have been found including sponges, marble, agate beads, green, yellow and blue glass beads. The findings also include elephant tusks, copper ointment and sheets of wire. Rare artifacts including iron edged corners, gold ornaments, stylus, terracotta stamps, diaphragm tiles, firefly toys have been found as well, along with other tools.

== Keezhadi Cluster ==
Keezhadi was initially chosen by Amarnath Ramakrishnan and his team at ASI in a search along the banks of Vaigai for the most promising site for a river bank civilisation near Madurai and was chosen because of many nearby mounds.

Other sites near Keezhadi was jointly brought together with Keezhadi as the main site. The Keezhadi Cluster includes, Keezhadi, Agaram, Manalur, Konthagai (a burial site) and Pasiapuram.

== Controversies ==
=== 2017 claimed attempts to stall excavation ===
In 2017, some Tamil academics, including V. Arasu (the former head of the Department of Tamil Literature at the University of Madras), alleged that the Bharatiya Janata Party-led central government had made deliberate attempts to stall the excavations at Keezhadi. Arasu claimed that the BJP government had a "Hindutva agenda", and wanted to stop the Keezhadi project because the excavations at the site provided an "undeniable evidence of a secular culture in South India".

The ASI normally conducts excavations at a major archaeological site for five seasons (years). In 2016–17, after the conclusion of the second season at Keezhadi, the ASI transferred the Superintending Archaeologist (SA) K. Amarnath Ramakrishna to its Guwahati circle. This caused a controversy in Tamil Nadu, leading to allegations that the ASI had deliberately transferred the SA to stall the project. K. Amarnath Ramakrishna stated that he wanted to complete the excavation work at Keezhadi, and challenged his transfer order before the Central Administrative Tribunal.

The ASI clarified that the transfer was ordered in accordance with the organisation's policy, which mandates that the maximum tenure of an SA in a particular circle is only for two years. K. Amarnath Ramakrishna had completed more than three years at the Excavation Branch VI, located in Bengaluru, under which the Keezhadi site has been excavated. The ASI decided to replace him with P S Sriraman, who had earlier served as a Deputy SA in the Jodhpur circle. K. Amarnath Ramakrishna was not the only officer to be transferred; 26 other officers had been transferred all over India. Moreover, the newly appointed SA P.S. Sriraman was a native of Tamil Nadu.

The Union Ministry also clarified that it had no intention to stop or delay the excavations at Keezhadi. It also explained that there was a delay in allocation of funds for the third season of excavation, because the ministry had not received the report for the work done in the past two years on time. Once the report was submitted, the ministry immediately cleared the funds for the third season of excavations at Keezhadi. The reports of the first two years of research will be released as a book.

=== Controversy in 2025 about Amarnath Ramakrishna report ===
The controversy in 2025 revolves around archaeologist Amarnath Ramakrishna's report on the ancient civilisation found in Keezhadi submitted nearly two years ago. The Archaeological Survey of India has requested him to revise his report, a request Ramakrishna has refused. This disagreement has escalated into a political clash between the central government and Tamil Nadu government. ASI demanded for revision as it questioned the dating and depth of certain findings in Ramakrishna's report, suggesting that the evidence for the earliest period was too early and required further analysis. However, Ramakrishna refused to rewrite his conclusions. He asserts that his work is scientifically sound, based on rigorous archaeological standards, and that the report's chronology is backed by stratographic sequences, material culture, and accelerator mass spectrometry dating. In the ensuing political storm in Tamil Nadu, many political parties, including the DMK and VCK, as well as historian R. Balkrishnan, have criticised the ASI's decision, calling it an attempt to suppress Tamil heritage. Union Minister for Culture Gajendra Singh Shekhawat stated that Ramakrishna's findings are not technically well-supported and require further scientific studies to be validated. He emphasised the need for more results, data, and evidence, arguing that a single finding cannot change the entire discourse. Tamil Nadu's Minister for Archaeology, Thangam Thennarasu, accused the central government of having an "unquenchable desire to treat Tamils as second-class citizens." MDMK leader Vaiko alleged that the center is trying to suppress Tamil civilisation while promoting a "non-existent Sanskrit civilization."

On 17 June 2025, K. Amarnath Ramakrishna was transferred from his post of Director of Antiquity at the National Mission on Monuments and Antiquities (NMMA) to Director of the NMMA’s Greater Noida office. This was his third transfer in nine months, coming shortly after he refused to revise his final report on Keezhadi excavations submitted to the Archaeological Survey of India. This transfer was seen by many as a "punishment posting" as this unit has remained almost defunct. It has drawn sharp reactions from the people, especially politicians, of Tamil Nadu.

On 10 July 2025, it was reported that the Archaeological Survey of India (ASI) has granted permission to retired archaeologist P.S. Sriraman, who led the third phase of excavations at Keeladi and a season at Kodumanal, to prepare detailed reports on his work. So he will be writing reports on the third phase of excavations at Keeladi and one season of excavations at Kodumanal. Sriraman, who retired in 2019, confirmed he had sought access to related materials housed in Chennai to complete the pending reports. This comes after K. Amarnath Ramakrishna, who was asked by the ASI to revise his report but was transferred to Noida on 17 June 2025 after he refused, defending his findings. Back in 2017 too, Ramakrishna was transferred to Assam, and Sriraman, his successor at the time, had reported no continuity in the previously discovered brick structures. Since then, after a PIL in the Madurai bench of the Madras High Court, the Tamil Nadu State Department of Archaeology (TNSDA) has been conducting excavations at Keeladi, completing ten phases by 2024-25.

In an interview with Jaya Menon, Amarnath Ramakrishna stated that altering the dating of the Keeladi civilisation in his report would be "criminal." He emphasized that only minor proofreading or adding missing illustrations is acceptable after submission, not changes to core findings.

=== Internal evaluation of the report by ASI ===
In December 2025, Archaeological Survey of India had released a 114-page “critical evaluation and recommendation” note, describing K. Amarnath Ramakrishna's 982-page report as ambiguous, incomplete and underdeveloped, citing structural issues, weak source attribution and insufficient contextualisation. Ramakrishna formally rejected it on 5 February 2026, calling it “more mechanical” than factual. While demanding immediate publication of his original report; he questioned the legitimacy of the review process, calling the formation of an internal committee to reassess an excavator’s interpretations unprecedented, criticised the absence of unanimity among committee members, objected to receiving a separate critique instead of annotated corrections, alleged the review lacked scholarly rigour and even appeared AI-assisted, and noted that the reviewers had never visited the Keezhadi site, arguing that his conclusions on the site’s chronology from roughly the 8th century BCE to the early centuries CE were firmly based on stratigraphy and material culture following ASI methodology. The note from ASI was prepared by archaeologists Priyank Gupta, Garima Kaushik, P. Aravazhi, Hemsagar A. Naik, and Nandini Bhattacharya Sahu.

== Related Media ==
The Dig: Keeladi and the Politics of India's Past was a book published in December 2025 written by Sowmiya Ashok based on the Keeladi excavations and its surrounding controversies. It was widely praised for elaborating the cultural and nationalist conotations of the archeological study.

== Gallery ==
The following photographs were taken at the excavation site on 11 October 2016.

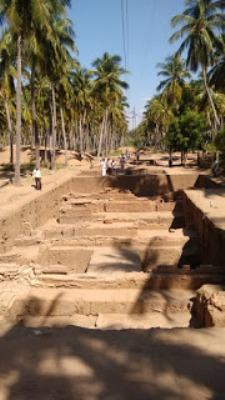

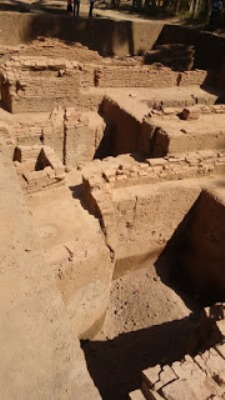

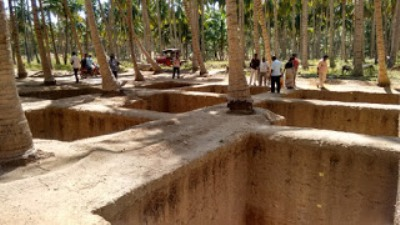

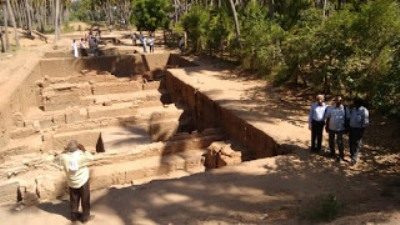

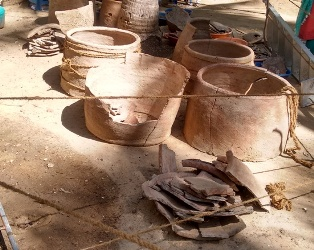

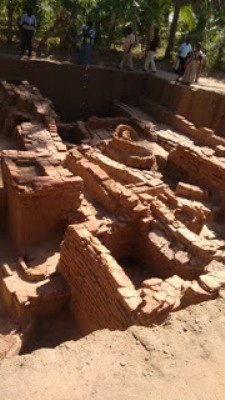

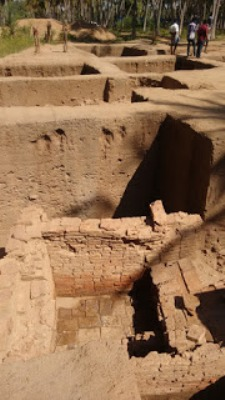

== See also ==
- Arikamedu
- Adichanallur archaeological site
- Kodumanal
