= Chennanur =

Neighbourhood in Krishnagiri district, Tamil Nadu, India

- Neighbourhood
- Interactive map of Chennanur
- Coordinates: 12.2938°N 78.5415°E
- Country: India
- State: Tamil Nadu
- District: Krishnagiri
- Elevation: 366.53 m (1,202.5 ft)

Languages
  - Official: Tamil
  - Speech: Tamil, Kannada
- Time zone: UTC+5:30 (IST)
- PIN: 635307
- Telephone code: +914341******
- Vehicle registration: TN - 24 ** xxxx
- Other Neighbourhoods: Uthangarai, Upparapatti, Appinaickenpatti, Gangapirampatti, Kollanaikanoor
- LS: Krishnagiri
- VS: Uthangarai

Chennanur is an archaeological site in Krishnagiri district of Tamil Nadu state in India.

== Location ==
Chennanur is located with the coordinates of (12.2938°N 78.5415°E) near Uthangarai.

Chennanur (Tamil Nadu)

== Archaeological importance ==
It was one of the plans of Tamil Nadu State Department of Archaeology (TNSDA) to excavate the Chennanur archaeological site along with three other sites in Tamil Nadu, by the Tamil Nadu State Archaeology department, after getting the permissions from Archaeology Survey department of India.

A broken Neolithic handaxe was found during the excavations carried out at Chennanur and totally 327 artefacts were unearthed from Chennanur site. The antiquities and postherds found in this village during the excavations show the early periods of Tamil culture. Bricks belong to Stone age dating back around 500 BCE were also unearthed at this site.
