= Tamil Nadu State Department of Archaeology =

Research department in India

- Formation: 1961
- Type: Governmental Research Organization
- Purpose: Conservation and preservation of ancient monuments, and to conduct excavations at historical sites in Tamil Nadu
- Location: Chennai, India
- Commissioner: T. Udhayachandran
- Website: http://www.tnarch.gov.in/

Tamil Nadu State Department of Archaeology (TNSDA) was set up in 1961 as an official research department. It is located in Chennai which is the capital and largest city of Tamil Nadu, the southernmost state of India. Tamil Nadu State Department of Archaeology disseminates Tamil Nadu ancient cultural heritage knowledge through several main methods including fieldwork, analysis and publication. The main objective of the department is conservation and preservation of ancient monuments, and to conduct excavations at historical sites in Tamil Nadu.

== Administrative Structure ==
The department is headed by the Commissioner of Archaeology and is assisted by Joint Director (Technical), deputy directors, (Technical), Regional Assistant Directors, Executive Engineer, Assistant Executive Engineers, Junior Engineers, deputy director (Admin.), assistant directors (Admin.), Archaeological Officers and other officers. The commissioner and deputy director lead about 139 administration positions and 89 technical positions covering regional, epigraphy, conservation, excavation, and publication.

The Commissioner of Archaeology now is T. Udhayachandran. In addition, the department has eight district archaeological offices. The daily work of an officer involves participating in exploration and excavation work, as well as collecting precious antiques such as manuscripts and scattered sculptures.

== Archaeological Excavation ==
Carrying out archaeological excavations in historically important sites in Tamil Nadu is the core activity of the department. Besides the accidental finds, most excavation is based on field exploration. The election of the site for excavation is made on the basis of the study of literature, history and inscriptions to find out the existence of important places such as capitals, ports and cities of ancient ruling monarchs and chieftains. The department has conducted excavation at more than 40 sites from 1968 to 2024. The excavation place covered Intertemporal sites includes early historic, modern, Megalithic, Medieval, Microlithic, Neolithic, Palaeolithic, Later Palaeolithic and Iron Age. The department has done a significant number of excavations that have revealed hidden cultural sequences of Tamil history. Some essential excavated sites from pre-historic to that of Historic period are founded at Tiruttangal, Kannanur, Mangudi, Modur, Perur, Kovalanpottal, Anaimalai, Pallavamedu, Alagankulam, Boluvampatti, Panayakulam and Kurumbanmedu. These sites are contributed significantly to our understanding of ancient Indian history. They have revealed the cultural achievements of past civilizations. Along with the discovery of excellent artifacts, these excavations have confirmed “the location of ancient capitals, trade centers, and their relationship between South and North India, Tamil Nadu, and the Roman Empire”.

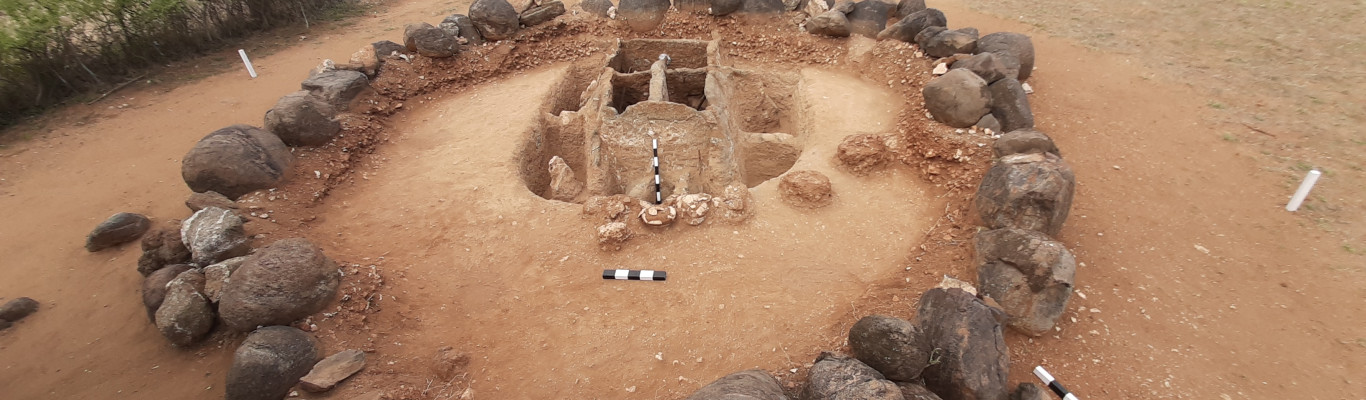
Archaeological Excavation, Kodumanal

=== Joint Archaeological Activities ===
In 2024, Tamil Nadu State Department of Archaeology and Odishan Institute of Maritime and South East Asian Studies have conducted the excavation at Palur, Odisha intend to trace the relation between the Tamil Nadu and Odisha. More than six hundred artifacts were excavated, including some important graffiti potsherds.

Other partners of Tamil Nadu State Department of Archaeology include The Archaeological Survey of India, Kerala State Department of Archaeology, University of Madras, Karnataka State Department of Archaeology, Kerala University and Sharma Centre for Education, Pune, etc. They have interacted and cooperated with each other and have contributed significantly to the cause of archaeology in India.

== Field Results ==
The archaeological investigations carried out in the excavated areas during the last 50 years have revolutionized the historical view of Tamil Nadu. The existence of Paleolithic, Mesolithic, Neolithic and Iron Age cultures has been demonstrated through fairly complete information gathered from excavations. Various aspects of contemporary human life during this period are also known.

=== The Paleolithic Period ===
A number of important prehistoric sites in Kortallayar support the discovery of the first recorded animal tracks in South Asia.The identification of the type of primitive human activity at one of these sites, Attirampakkam, reveals a Paleolithic culture.

=== Mesolithic Period ===
Numerous microlithic implements were yielded at Mangudi, Triuthangal, Thiruneveli, T. Kallupatti, Mayiladumparai, Dailamalai, Togarapalli, Mullikadu, and Kovalanpottal sites. It is consistent with the Mesolithic culture's extensive use of Fine Stone Age stones for tool making.

=== The Neolithic Peroid ===
The large number of objects excavated at Tami Nadu, such as polished stonework and fragments of handmade pots of many colors, suggests transformative transitions between several eras, such as the Neogene and Megalithic eras.

=== Iron Age ===
“Excavations in Sanur, Amirthamangalam, Kodumanal, Adichanallur, and Mallappadi have revealed the existence of Iron Age settlements and associated cultural characteristics in Tamil Nadu.”

=== Historical Era ===
One of the important discoveries of this period is the cross-regional exchange. For example, the tiny dark blue, dark red and some other colors of glass beads found in large quantities at Arikamedu are similar to those found in Korea, Thailand, East Africa, Southeast Asia, coastal Japan and other regions.

In addition, excavations at Uraiyur, Tirukkampuliyur and Alagarai have revealed many fragments of pottery inscribed with scripts, proving the widespread use of writing in all social classes.

=== Medieval Period ===
The main discoveries of this period are related to the formation, construction and development of the city.

=== Modern Era ===
The excavations at Gingee, Tranquebar (Taragampadi), and Panchalankurichi have contributed positively to the study of daily life, warfare, and trade in the modern era. The excavations at Keeladi have been an important contribution to the understanding of the broad cultural history of the Indian subcontinent.

== Lately Great Discovery ==
Archaeologists from the Tamil Nadu State Department of Archaeology have confirmed that iron technology was indeed introduced to present-day Tamil Nadu approximately 5,300 years ago.

TNSDA's team uses advanced dating techniques (Accelerator Mass Spectrometry and Optically Stimulated Luminescence) on artifacts recently excavated across the state. The results revealed a consistent pattern of dates, ranging from 3,345 BCE to 2,172 BCE, with a significant cluster of dates around 2,500 BCE. According to R Sivanantham, Joint Director of TNSDA, the introduction of iron in India, particularly in Tamil Nadu, can be dated in the early part of the 4th millennium BCE.”

== Preservation and Development of Discoveries ==
=== Registration of Antiquities ===
Tamil Nadu stands first in the country in issuing registration certificates.

=== Chemical Preservation of Art Objects ===
The Archaeological Chemistry Laboratory, which has been in operation since 1980, is also an important organization of department. The main objective of the laboratory is preserving monuments and antiquities by chemical means, such as bronze statues, copper plates, coins, terracotta warriors, plasters and paintings. Part of chemically treated antiques are display at the museum.

=== Site Museum ===
Site museums are set up at sites of archaeological importance where excavations are carried out for the benefit of scholars, researchers and the general public. So far, apart from one underwater archaeology museum in Poompuhar, there are 14 regional archaeological site museums managed by the department.

==== List of Notable Site Museums ====
Pre-Historic Site Museum, Poondi (Tiruvallur District)

Established in 1985, this museum exhibits pre-historic artifacts found around Poondi and other parts of Tamil Nadu. It is the only site Museum in India, which portrays regional prehistory.

Fort Dansborg Museum, Tharangambadi (Mayiladuthurai District)

Originally built in 1620 by the Danes, Fort Dansborg now houses a museum that exhibits artifacts from the Danish colonial era, including coins, pottery, weapons, and historical documents. TNSDA took over the fort in 1978 and renovated it three times.

Vettuvan Koil, Kalugumalai (Thoothukudi District)

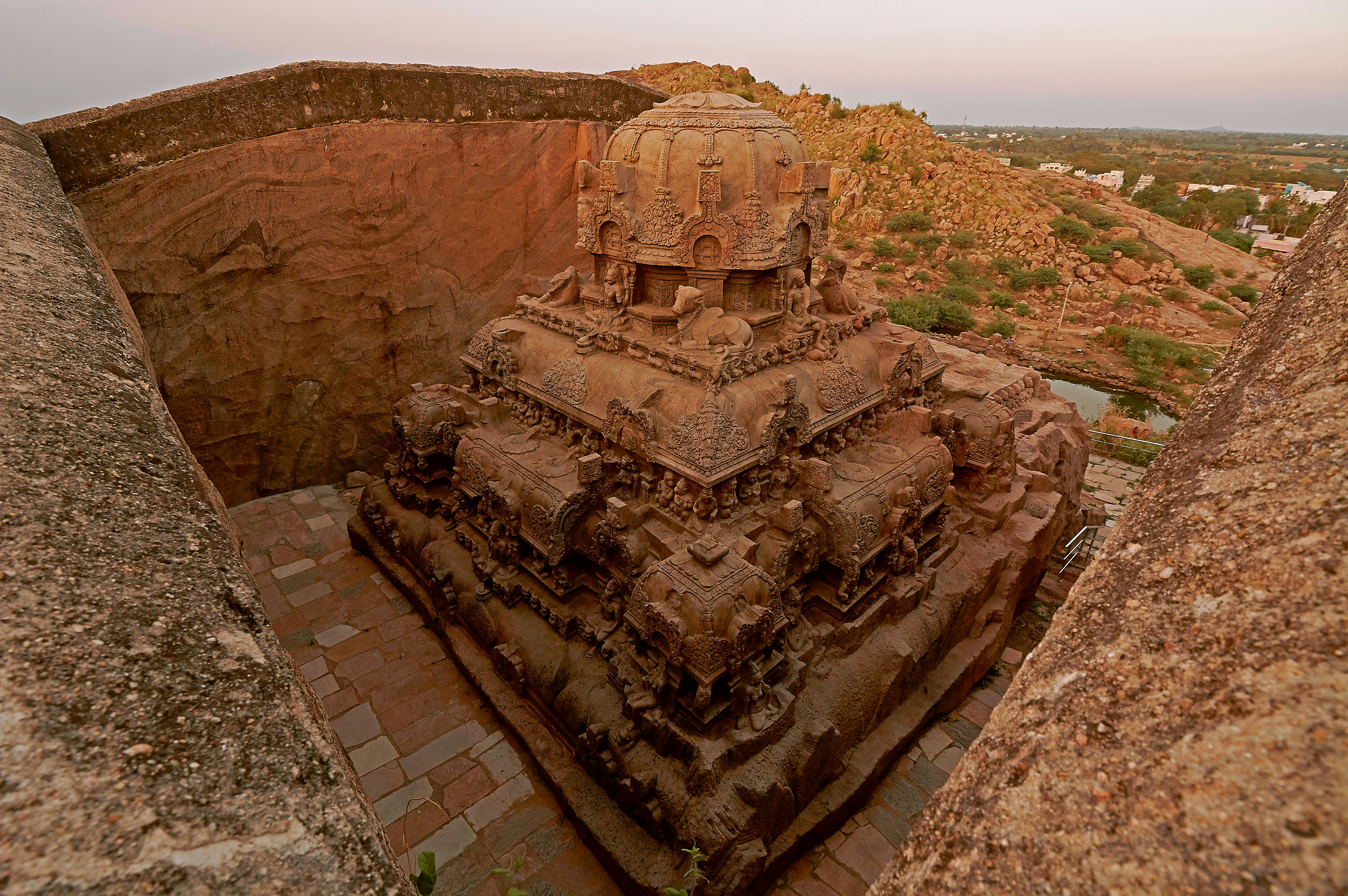
Vettuvan Koil

The Vettuvan Koil is located in a rocky hill by name Kalugumalai in Tuticorin District. It is a rock cut temple where Lord Shiva is the chief deity. This rock-cut temple, dating back to the 8th century CE, is maintained by the TNSDA as a protected monument. Intricately carved with images of gods and goddesses, this temple is magnificent and an ideal place for history buffs interested in sculpture, ancient caves and excavations.

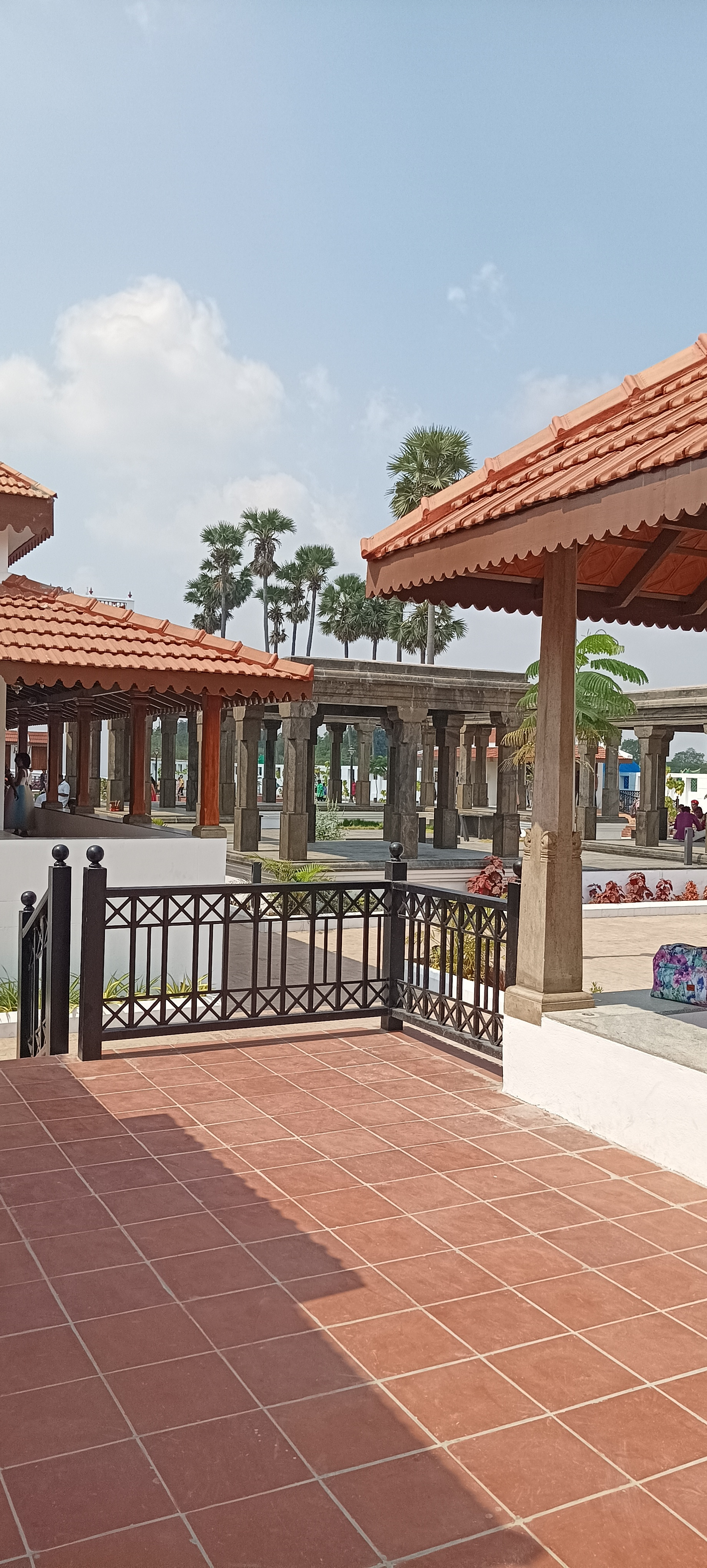
Keeladi Museum

Keeladi Museum, Keeladi (Sivagangai District)

The construction, spanning approximately 2 acres culminated in a museum complex encompassing a built-up area of around 31,000 square feet. "The six zones of the museum cover exhibitions on subjects as diverse as Vaigai and Keeladi, agriculture and water management, ceramic industry, weaving and beads, maritime trade and lifestyle. Semi-open and open spaces are designed for workshops and performances to enhance the visitor experience". The museum receives over 2000 visitors on weekdays and nearly 5000 on weekends.

Further, in the budget presentation for 2022–2023, it has been announced that the Tribal Museum at Courtallam in Tenkasi District, Prehistoric Sites Museum at Poondi in Tiruvallur District, and Heroes' Stone Museum at Dharmapuri in Dharmapuri District will be upgraded at an estimated cost of Rs. 1 crore.

There are also a number of museums in a state of incomplete construction, such as the Porunai Museum at Tirunelveli District, Gangaikondacholapuram Museum at Ariyalur District, Courtallam Site Museum and Dharmapuri Site Museum.

The construction of museums has become an important part of local tourism.

==== Tourism ====
The Department of Archaeology identified more than 60 historical monuments for being declared as “protected monuments and site”.

Three protected monuments (Sarjah Madi at Thanjavur, Danish Fort at Tarangambadi, Mayiladuthurai and Tirumalai Nayak Mahal at Madurai) are being taken up for conservation and restoration work to facilitate heritage tourism.

A sum of Rs.3,22,05,547/- has been sanctioned for the project to preserve the various archaeological treasures and a sum of Rs.1,38,45,547/- as non-recurring grant is sanctioned for the financial year 2022-2023 for the procurement. The procurement items have already in use and four unprotected sculptures were conserved with proper protection measures during 2023–2024.

Tamili inscriptions and Jaina sculptures in five spots of different districts were developed as tourist attractions and infrastructure and basic amenities.

== Education and Research Source ==
The department offered Post Graduate Diploma in Epigraphy and Archaeology.

With reference to the Madras University Order No. AII/ASO-II/DA/Ph.D. Recogn. /2003, dated 30.05.2003, the Department of Archaeology has been recognized as a center for research purpose leading to Ph.D. Degree.

The Institute of Archaeology underwent a complete overhaul in the academic year 2020-2021 and was subsequently renamed as “Tamil Nadu Institute of Archaeology and Museum Studies” in the academic year 2021–2022. Since its inception in 1974, the institute has been functioning as a center of education and training at the departmental headquarters. The Tamil Nadu Institute of Archaeology and Museology offers several specialized diplomas such as Post-Graduate Diploma in Archaeology, Post-Graduate Diploma in Epigraphy and Post-Graduate Diploma in Heritage Management and Museology.

The Institute of Archaeology and Museology of Tamil Nadu "places practical training at the forefront, including a series of activities such as tool making, beading, bronze casting, structural and chemical conservation, exploration, excavation, document collation, antiquities display, and the reproduction and deciphering of inscriptions, all supervised by experts in the relevant fields".

In addition, students also participate in on-site visits to UNESCO World Heritage Sites and historical sites affiliated with various government agencies, including the Archaeological Survey of India and the Department of Archaeology of Tamil Nadu.

Besides, the department published over 200 e-books and numerous journals, reports and guidebooks to construct source system and help field excavation.

=== Government Oriental Manuscripts Library and Research Centre ===
As a government institution, The Government Oriental Manuscripts Library and Research Centre started in 1869 and operates under the Tourism, Culture and Hindu Religious Endowment Department of Government of Tamil Nadu. It is not only one of the best and biggest manuscripts libraries around the world, but also the first manuscript library sharing its collections online.

The administrative chart shows that the center has three parts: Administration, Library and Pandit under the management of curator.

The nucleus of the large number of manuscripts preserved in the Oriental Manuscript Library of the Government of Madras are from the collections of Colonel Colin Mackenzie, Dr. Leyden, and Mr. c.p. Brown, and consists of manuscripts of multidisciplinary works written in South Indian and Oriental languages. Kaifiyats and inscriptions found in many places belonging to different periods are also included. So far, it houses “invaluable 50,580 palm leaf manuscripts, 22,134 paper manuscripts and 25,373 reference books” in various languages covering multiple subjects.

==== Functions ====
- 1) Identifying, acquiring, classifying, and cataloging manuscripts.
- 2) Preserve palm-leaf and paper manuscripts.
- 3) To publish rare manuscripts in book form.
- 4) Convert the Manuscripts images into Microfilm format and digital format.
- 5) Dissemination of information about manuscripts.
- 6) Publication of multilingual bulletins.
- 7) Awareness creation of manuscriptology.

== Epigraphy ==
The establishment of a dedicated epigraphy wing within the department in 1966 aimed at systematically copying inscriptions from diverse substrates, including rocky surfaces, stone pillars, slabs, temple walls, copper plates, ceramics and palm-leaf manuscripts.

Transcription, decipherment, and publication of stone inscriptions is important part of department activities. The inscriptions that have been copied and published aid in understanding the various stages of Tamil language development as well as the linguistic differences between Tamil and other languages. Presently, the epigraphy wing maintains approximately 26,142 estampages of inscriptions sourced from 38 districts, with ongoing efforts focused on recording inscriptions in Pudukkottai, Sivagangai, and Thoothukudi districts. Of these estampages, 15,945 inscriptions have been deciphered and 10,197 have been published across 67 volumes.

=== Diversity of Inscriptions ===
The inscriptions documented by TNSDA are diverse in language, script, and content:

Tamil-Brahmi Script: It is the earliest known form of Tamil script and is thought to have appeared in the 3RD century BC. Developed from the Brahmi script, these inscriptions provide insights into the early use of the Tamil language and script.

Pulli Script: It is a cursive variant of Tamil-Brahmi, emerged in the 2nd century BCE.

Vattezhuthu Script: Vattezhuthu inscriptions have been found dating from the 4th to 6th centuries CE. They are commonly found in Tamil Nadu and Kerala.

Grantha script: developed in the 5th century CE, it was mostly used for writing Sanskrit, and other Prakrit languages. Religious and scholarly contexts are the most common avenues of use.

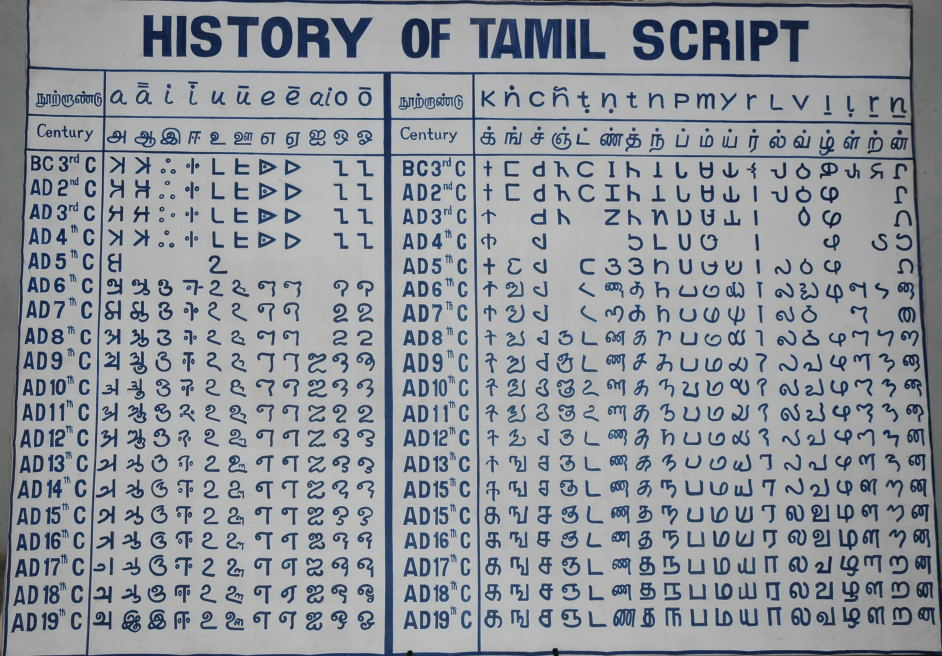
History of Tamil script

Tamil Script (Arwi): It was developed from the vattezhutu script in the 9th Century AD. The Tamil script is the more modern one that has been used in recent times.

European Inscriptions: Reflecting colonial influences, inscriptions in Portuguese, Danish, Dutch, French, Latin, Greek, Armenian, and English are found on tombs, churches, forts, and statues across Tamil Nadu.

Guild Inscriptions: These inscriptions provide information about trade guilds and their operations, offering a glimpse into the economic history of the region.

== Negative Impact ==
Taj Syndrome: the preservation of the “glamorous” elements of India's architectural and artistic heritage has overridden the modest concerns of the past. There is a lack of awareness of the need to protect sites with larger structural/sculptural remains or evidence of art. Fragile and almost invisible elements of the natural landscape, such as Palaeolithic sites and their stone artifacts, fossils, features and deposits are overlooked by communities and government authorities.

Damage caused by Infrastructure, agricultural and tourism development have also persisted. Relevant legislation is outdated, and site protection lacks effective guidance and legal support.

Not only is there too little knowledge of prehistoric sites in the community and government officials in general, but there is often a lack of coordination and understanding within government departments and among the various non-governmental organizations/institutes and universities.

The associated risks and damages have presented a critical situation that urgently requires effective and multiple initiatives to intervene, for which the Institute of Archaeology bears a major responsibility.
