= Kollanaikanoor =

- Village
- Location in Tamil Nadu, India

- Location in Tamil Nadu, India Kollanaikanoor (India)
- Coordinates: 12.2857521°N 78.5260249°E
- Country: India
- State: Tamil Nadu
- District: Krishnagiri
- Town: Uthangarai
- Village: Kollanaikanoor

Government
  - Type: Panchayati raj (India)
  - Body: Gram panchayat
- Elevation: 780 m (2,560 ft)

Population (2014)
  - Total: Under estimation

Languages
  - Official: Tamil(தமிழ்)
- Time zone: UTC+5:30 (IST)
- PIN: 635207
- Telephone code: 04341
- Vehicle registration: TN-24
- Sex ratio: 944/1,000 ♂/♀

Kollanaikanoor is a village near Uthangarai, Krishnagiri district, in the state of Tamil Nadu, India. The village is filled with coconut and mango trees, and contains the Adhiparasakthi Temple.

== Education ==
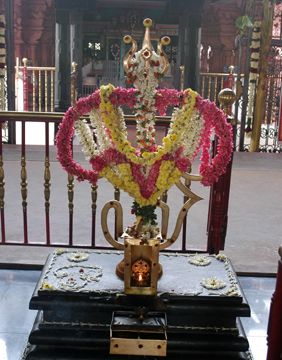
Om Sakthi

Schools in this area are Adhiyaman Matric Higher Secondary School and Kollanaikanoor Public School.

== Transport ==
The nearest railway station is at Samalpatti (7 km from Uthangarai), on the NH-66 to Krishnagiri. There are two regular passenger trains, one running between Erode and Jolarpet and the other between Salem and Katpadi. Some Express trains such as the Yercaud express and Bokaro mail also stop here. The nearest railway junction is Jolarpettai Junction railway station which is 30 km away from Uthangarai. Most Express trains stop here.

The National Highway 66 passes through Kollanaikanoor. Uthangarai is at the junction of the main routes from Pondichery to Bangalore & Chennai to Salem.

The nearest airports are Salem Airport and Bangalore International Airport.

== Climate and rainfall ==
The seasonal climate conditions are moderate. The weather is colder during winter and hotter in the summer due to the hills and fields surrounding the village.

The average maximum and minimum temperature are 42 °C and 13 °C. The town typically receives a maximum rainfall of 35 cm, 37 cm during September, October and November. Light moderate rainfall of 10 cm to 32 cm occurs during the months of June, July & August.

The wind direction from April to September is southwest. September is usually a still cold month, with light and varying winds. By October the winds shifts to northeast succeeded by north-east monsoon and winter season begins. The south-west wind begins to carry on the southwest monsoon with occasional showers up to August.
