= Adichanallur =

Archaeological site in Tamil Nadu, India

- ஆதிச்சநல்லூர்
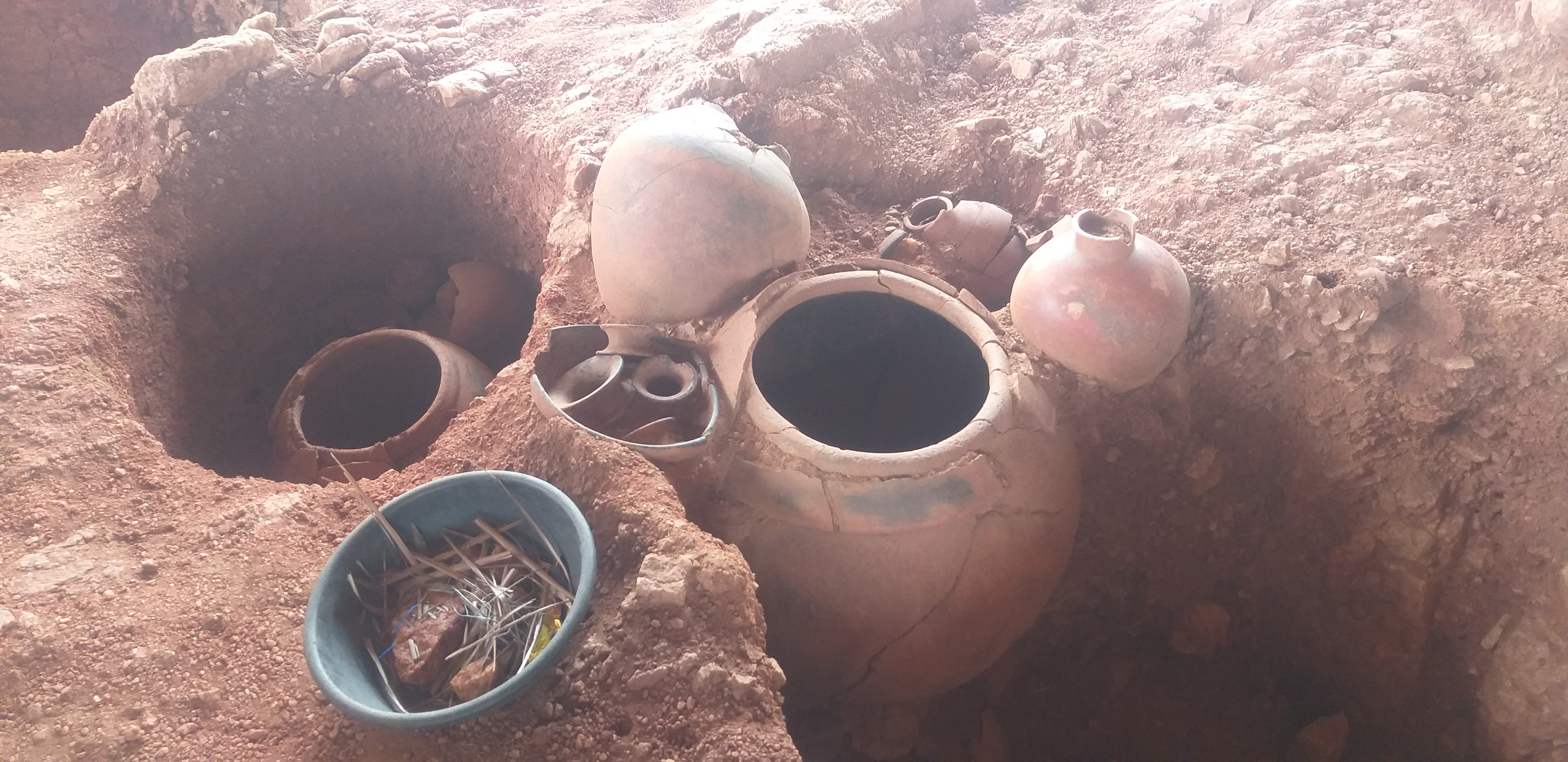

- Location within Tamil Nadu Location within India
- 8.6279°N 77.8732°E
- Type: Settlement
- Cultures: Ancient Tamils
- Location: Thoothukudi, India

History
- Built: 905 BC–696 BC

Site notes
- Excavation dates: 1876–present

Adichanallur is an archaeological site in Thoothukudi district in Tamil Nadu, India that has been the site of a number of very important archaeological finds. Korkai, the capital of the Early Pandyan Kingdom, is located about 15 km from Adichanallur. Carbon dating of samples excavated in 2004 from the Adichanallur site has revealed that they belonged to the period between 1000 BC and 600 BC. In 2005, around 169 clay urns containing human skeletons were unearthed that date back to at-least 3,800 years. In 2018, research on copper metal remains were dated at Manipur University to 1500 BC (+ or - 700 years). But the dating method was not accepted as accurate and carbon dating of the remains is emphasized to settle the issue and reduce the error margin in OSL dating.

== Present Excavations ==
In 2004, a number of skeletons were found buried in earthenware urns. Some of these urns contained writing in Tamili (Tamil-Brahmi) script.

On March 18, 2019, the report of artifact samples sent to Beta Analytic Testing Laboratory, USA for carbon dating was obtained. The results were submitted to the Madurai Bench of the Madras High Court on April 4, 2019. Carbon dating of samples excavated from the Adichanallur site in Thoothukudi district has revealed that they belonged to the period between 905 BC to 696 BC. A Division Bench of Justices N. Kirubakaran and S. S. Sundar observed that this proved Adichanallur was one of the earliest ancient sites in Tamil Nadu. The court had expressed its displeasure that the artifacts, first excavated in 2004-06 under the supervision of the then Superintending Archaeologist T. Satyamurthy, were not sent for carbon dating for over 15 years. “In spite of many efforts taken by intellectuals, historians, political leaders and archaeologists, nothing was done by the ASI, for reasons best known to them, to send the Adichanallur samples for carbon dating,” the court said. The court had earlier directed the ASI to fence the whole site that is spread across 114 acres and put up a police outpost to prevent any damage. With Sathyabama Badrinath, former Regional Director (South), ASI, currently with the Delhi circle, nominated for preparing the report, the court said that the reports of T. Satyamurthy could also be added in achieving a comprehensive report

== Historical Excavations ==
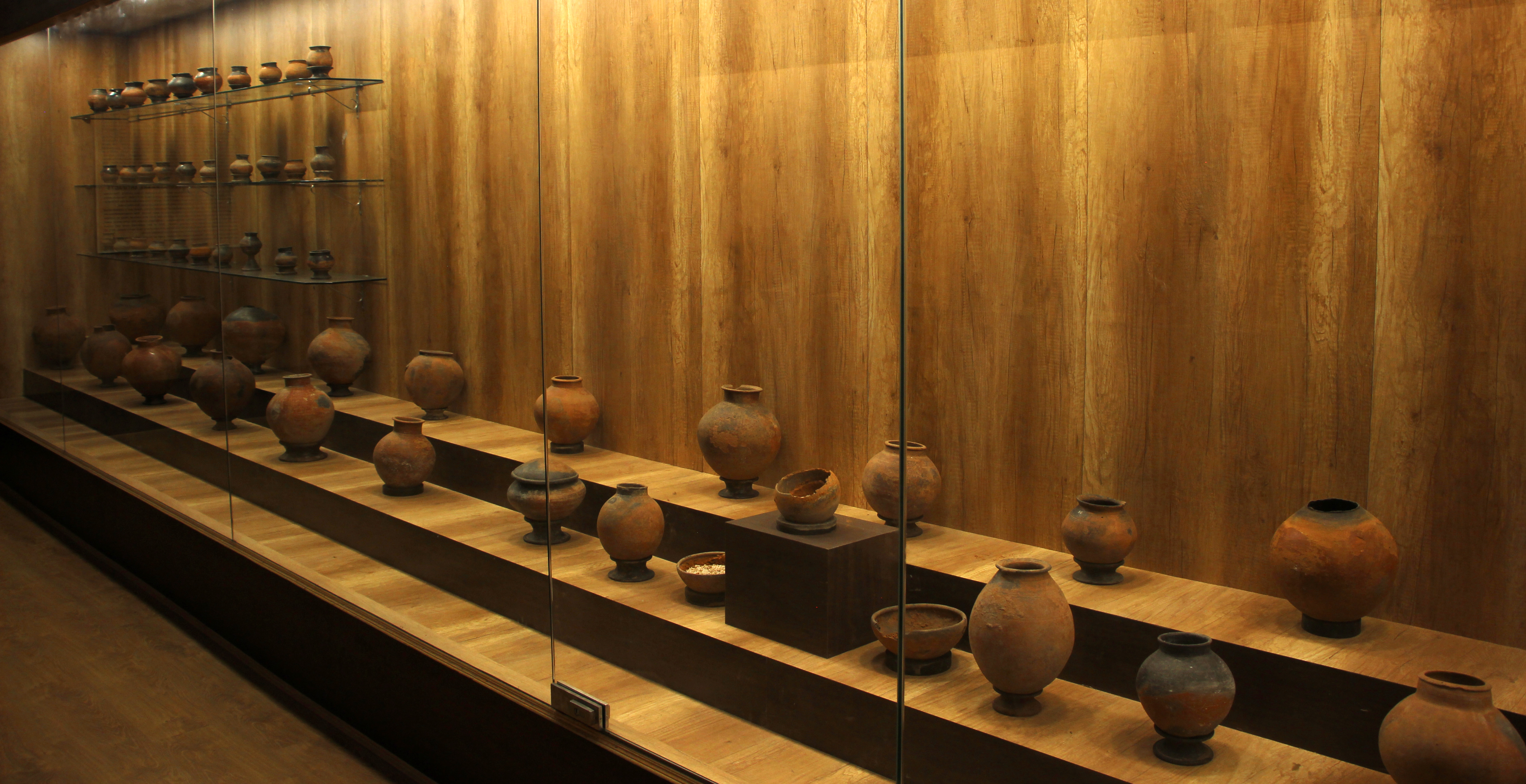
Findings from Adichanallur, in the Government Museum, Chennai

Adichanallur first gained attention in the year 1876 when a team of three eminent people visited it. The team consisted of the then Collector of Tirunelvely district, district engineer and an Ethnologist from Germany called Dr. Jagor. The team started excavating in one side of a mound and discovered many earthen pots that were of superior quality than the ones being sold at the bazaars of the late 19th Century. Also found were baked earthenware utensils, a number of iron weapons and implements (mainly knives, short sword blades and hatchets) and a huge number of bones and skulls.

Alexander Rea, a former Superintendent from Southern Circle Archaeological Survey of India pointed out that all these artifacts were taken away by Dr. Jagor for the Berlin Museum für Völkerkunde, currently called as Ethnological Museum of Berlin. Alexander Rea himself had done a detailed investigation of the sites during the period between 1899 and 1905, when he was able to find a large number of artifacts similar to Dr. Jagor.

All the artifacts that Rea found was promptly cataloged and documented in his 1915 book titled "Catalog of the Prehistoric Antiquities from Adichanallur and Perambair". It is surprising to note that although the catalog consisted of huge amounts of bronze, iron, gold and earthen artifacts combined, the present day excavations yielded mainly earthen wares only. All of Rea's artifacts are supposedly present in India.

== In-Situ Museum ==
On August 5, 2023, Union Minister for Finance Nirmala Sitharaman laid the foundation stone for a museum in Adichanallur. Upon completion, this will be one of the first on-site museums in India.

== See also ==
- Keezhadi Excavation site
- Kodumanal
- Arikamedu
