= R. Balakrishnan =

Bureaucrat Researcher Orator Writer Poet

- ஆர். பாலகிருஷ்ணன்
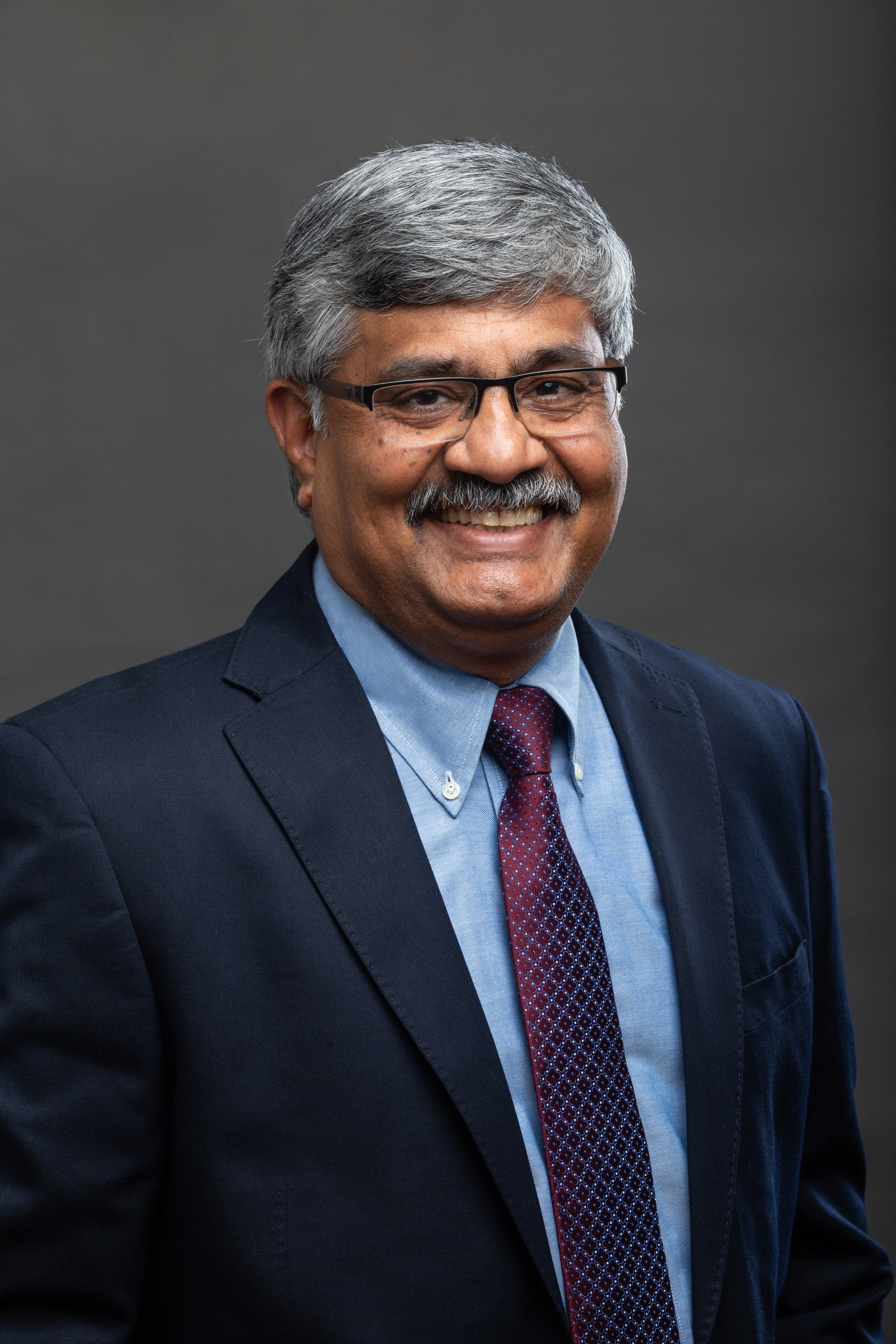
- R. Balakrishnan
- Born: November 6, 1958 (age 67); Dindigul; Tamil Nadu; India
- Occupation: Indian Administrative Service

R. Balakrishnan (ஆர். பாலகிருஷ்ணன், born November 6, 1958) is a retired civil servant, author, researcher, poet and has written several books in Tamil. He is a former Indian Administrative Service officer. After his retirement in 2018, he served as the chief advisor to the Chief Minister of Odisha state government till 2024. He served as the Chairman of the International Institute of Tamil Studies, Chennai from February 2024 till May 2026.

== Early life ==
R. Balakrishnan was born in Natham (Dindigul district) and raised in Madurai. He studied BA and MA Tamil Literature with Journalism as optional in Madurai. Later, he received a Diploma in Journalism from Madurai Kamaraj University. He worked as Sub-Editor in Dinamani Daily Newspaper, Madurai Edition from 1980 to July 1984. He was the first candidate to take the civil service exams in Tamil and was selected to the Indian Administrative Services in the first attempt. Till date he is the only person who has this credentials (i.e., B.A. and M.A. in Tamil literature and civil services in Tamil). He belongs to the 1984 batch of IAS officers.

== Career ==
In his thirty-four years of civil service with the Government of Odisha and the Government of India, Balakrishnan held several notable positions. He retired as the additional chief secretary and development commissioner in 2018. Earlier, he held the assignment of Deputy Election Commissioner, Election Commission of India twice. He also served as the Chief Vigilance Officer, Chennai Petroleum Corporation Limited, Chennai. After retirement he served as the Chief Advisor to the Chief Minister's Office and Chief Advisor (Special Initiatives) Government of Odisha.

Balakrishnan is a Trustee at the Roja Muthiah Research Library Trust (RMRLT) and also the Honorary Consultant to the Indus Research Centre at the RMRL. He served as the chairman of the International Institute of Tamil Studies from Feb 2024 to May 2026.

His significant contribution as a civil servant are in the areas of Election Management, Disaster Management, Finance Management, Odia Language and Culture.

== Research ==
R. Balakrishnan is a researcher in the field of Onomastics, Indus Studies, Indology, and Tamil Studies. He works on the issues connected to the Dravidian origin, the prehistory of Tamils and Indus Valley Civilization. He follows a multi-disciplinary approach in the reconstruction of the past with a focus on place name clusters. Using comparative place name clusters as markers for past migrations, he has published research papers. He has researched Konark Sun temple and the tribal origins of Sun worship.

In 1997, he brought out the evidence for the existence of a cluster of place names in tribal areas of Madhya Pradesh (Chhattisgarh) that are exact counterparts of place names used in Madurai-Idukki region of southern India. He called this "Chhindwara Syndrome" and further investigations drew him to Indus Valley Civilization.

In 2010 at the World Classical Tamil Conference at Coimbatore, he announced evidence for a "Korkai-Vanji-Tondi Complex" (KVT Complex) that has survived in the place name corpora of northwestern parts of the Indian subcontinent. He cited this as evidence for the probable Dravidian presence in the Indus Valley region in the past.

His publication The 'High-West: Low-East' Dichotomy of Indus Cities: A Dravidian Paradigm (Indus Research Centre, Roja Muthiah Research Library, 2012) put forth multi-disciplinary evidence in favour of the Dravidian Hypothesis. His Tamil publication Cintuveḷip paṇpāṭṭiṉ tirāviṭa aṭittaḷam (சிந்துவெளிப் பண்பாட்டின் திராவிட அடித்தளம்) was described by the Indus scholar Iravatham Mahadevan as the "most remarkable among the Tamil works published so far on this subject". The book has acquired greater significance as the announcement about the Keezhadi excavation and its probable similarities to Harappan artefacts was made within a few months of publication.

He was awarded Doctor of Letters (Honoris Causa) by Periyar Maniammai University for his contribution in the field of Indology and in the specific context of his book Cintuveḷip paṇpāṭṭiṉ tirāviṭa aṭittaḷam.

His book Journey of a Civilization: Indus to Vaigai was published in 2019 by the Roja Muthiah Research Library. He translated this to Tamil as Oru Panpattin Payanam: Sindhu mudhal Vaigai Varai and in 2023 it was released by the Honourable Chief Minister of Tamil Nadu Thiru M. K. Stalin.

He is honorary consultant to the Indus Research Centre of the Roja Muthiah Research Library, Chennai.

He has researched the prehistory and cultural heritage of Odisha. His recent book Abadha Padachinha is the Odia translation of his research articles on Odisha, its history, culture and heritage.

== Lectures ==
Balakrishnan has given numerous lectures on different topics in many forums and through online platforms.

- Keeladi Narpathu: 40 Questions and Answers about Keeladi Archaeological Site
- Sangachchurangam: A set of lectures delivered on Sangam literature with a lens containing a historical view , an anthropological view, a societal view. These lectures are an attempt to understand Sangam literature in a contemporary context. Based on the idea of Sangam corpus, Pattuppāṭṭu, ten sets of lectures with each containing ten topics are planned. Four set of lectures have been delivered so far since starting 2020.
  - Muthalam Pāṭṭu
  - Irandam Pāṭṭu
  - Moondram Pāṭṭu
  - Nangam Pāṭṭu

== Literary Works ==
Balakrishnan is also a poet and lyricist. He has written books in Tamil and English.

His publications are:

- Anbulla Amma (1991)
- Siragukkul Vaanam (2012)
- Sinduveli Panpattin Travida Adithalam (2016)
- Nattukkural (2016)
- Panmaayak Kalvan (2018)
- Irandam Sutru (2018)
- Abadha Padachinha (articles about Odisha)(translation in Odiya) (2019)
- Journey of a Civilization: Indus to Vaigai (2019)
- Kadavul Aayinum Aaga (2021)
- Ani Nadai Yerumai (2022)
- Oer Yer Uzhavan(2022)
- Oru Panpattin Payanam (2023)
- Ippadi Oru Theeya: Kural Thazhuviya Kadhal Kavithaigal (2023)
- Agasithyar: Oru Meelparvai (2025) Ebook available
