= Booluvampatti =

- suburb
- Location in Tamil Nadu, India
- Coordinates: 10°58′46″N 76°44′08″E
- Country: India
- State: Tamil Nadu
- Region: Kongu Nadu
- District: Coimbatore

Languages
  - Official: Tamil
- Time zone: UTC+5:30 (IST)
- PIN: 641109

Booluvampatti is a small village in Thondamuthur City located in south Taluka of Coimbatore district in Tamil Nadu, in India. It is 29.9 km from Coimbatore and 74.9 km from Palakkad. This village is near the forest boundary and its farm land often gets raided by wild elephants.

== History ==
It will be surprising to know that Boluvampatti is a medieval trade centre situated in the western bank of the Noyyal River. Kottaimedu or Kattaikadu are the derivative names is an ancient mound found at the east of the Vellingiri hills. There were more than 50 acres of medieval period habitation mound was located at the Mr.Aruswmany's land. In the year 1980's, the State Department Archaeology conducted an excavation here and six trenches were laid in two successive seasons. Beautiful terracotta figures, Buddha figure, Insignia of Tamil and medieval period potteries were unearthed. Two notable sherds were unearthed one is with Tamil brahmi characters and another is with Vatteluttu.

== Demographic ==
The local language in this village is Tamil. There are around 700 families in this village and the average population is 2400 out of which 1212 are male and 1,188 are female and children between ages 0–6 are 225.

== Administration ==
Booluvampatti is administered by Sarpanch (Head of the village) who is the elected representative of the village.
