= Kovalanpottal =

Coordinates: 9.9037°N 78.0997°E

Kovalanpottal is a place located in Palanganatham near Madakulam in Madurai district, Tamil Nadu, India. As per Tamil epic Silappatikaram, Kovalan is believed to be beheaded here by the orders of Pandyan king Neduncheziyan. It is one of the protected monuments in Tamil Nadu by the Archaeological Survey of India.
