= Hebbar (disambiguation) =

Hebbar is a Hindu surname from south India.

Hebbar or Hebbard may also refer to:

- Hebbar Iyengar, an Indian caste in Tamil Nadu

== See also ==
- Hebbard, a surname list
- Hebbariye, a place in Nabatieh Governorate, Lebanon
