= List of Tamil proverbs =

The List of Tamil Proverbs consists of some of the commonly used by Tamil people and their diaspora all over the world. There were thousands and thousands of proverbs were used by Tamil people, it is harder to list all in one single article, the list shows a few proverbs.

Proverbs	English Translation
அகத்தின் அழகு முகத்தில் தெரியும்.	The beauty of the soul is known in the face.The face is the index of the mind.
அறுக்கமாட்டாதவன் இடுப்பிலே ஐம்பத்தெட்டு அரிவாள்	He who is unable to reap, carries fifty-eight sickles at his side
அகங்கையிற் போட்டுப் புறங்கையை நக்கலாமா?	Having placed the thing on the palm, why lick the back of the hand?
ஆக்கப் பொறுத்தவனுக்கு, ஆறப் பொறுக்கலை	He waited for the food to cook, but couldn't wait for it to cool down
ஆழம் தெரியாமல் காலை வைக்காதே	Don't wade in without knowing the depth
ஆழாக்கு அரிசி, மூழாக்குப் பானை, முதலியார் வருகிற வீறாப்பப் பாரும்	The Mudaliyar has only a small measure of rice, but keeps a pot that can hold three such measures. Behold the pomp of the Mudaliyar!
ஆற்றிலே போட்டாலும் அளந்துப் போட வேண்டும்	Although you are throwing it into the river, measure it first
ஏட்டுச் சுரக்காய் கூட்டுக்கு உதவாது	Will the word pumpkin make a meal?
திட்டிக் கெட்டாருமில்லை, வாழ்த்தி வாழ்ந்தாருமில்லை	No man was ever ruined by being cursed, and no one ever prospered because he was blessed
அசைந்து தின்கிறது மாடு, அசையாமல் தின்கிறது வீடு	A cow eats moving, a house eats standing
அகல இருந்தால் நிகள உறவு, கிட்டவந்தால் முட்டப் பகை	If separated by a long distance, there will be long-lived friendship, but if they are near each other, there will be perfect hatred
அங்காடிக்காரியை பாடச்சொன்னால், வெங்காயம் கறிவேப்பில்லை என்பாள்	If a song be demanded of a woman going along with her market basket, she will exclaim Onions, Curry leaves
அங்கும் இருப்பான், இங்கும் இருப்பான், ஆக்கின சோற்றுக்குப் பங்கும் இருப்பான்	He is there, he is here, he has share also in the boiled rice
பால் சட்டிக்கு பூனை காவல் வைக்கிறதுபோல்	Asking a cat to guard the pot of milk
பாலுக்கும் காவல் பூனைக்கும் தோழன்	A friend of the cat can't be the guard for the milk
எரிகிற விட்டிலே பிடுங்கிறது லாபம்	Whatever you are able to secure from a burning house is a gain
சூடு கண்ட பூனை அடுப்பங்கரையில் சேராது	The cat that has got fire burns will never go near the kitchen
சீலை இல்லை என்று சித்தி வீட்டுக்கு போனாளாம், அவள் ஈச்சம் பாயை கட்டிகொண்டு எதிரே வந்தாளாம்	She went to her aunt's house since she had no sari, but her aunt came out wearing a rug made of date palm
மதில் மேல் பூனை போல	Like a cat on the wall
ஆடு நனைகிறது என்று ஓநாய் அழுகிறதாம்	The wolf cried that the sheep got drenched in rain
தண்ணீர் வெந்நீர் ஆனாலும் நெருப்பை அணைக்கும்	Even if the cold water becomes hot water, it will quench the fire
அறிவே ஆற்றல்	Knowledge is power
ஆட தெரியாதவள் கூடம் பற்றாது என்றாளாம்	A bad dancer blames that the stage is not big enough
கூத்தாடி கிழக்கே பார்த்தான், கூலிக்காரன் மேற்கே பார்த்தான்	The all-night dancer watched the east, the all-day labourer watched the west
ஊரார் வீட்டு நெய்யே, என் பொண்சாதி கையே	Though the ghee belonged to the village, it is my wife's hand that is serving the ghee
தன் வினை தன்னைச் சுடும், ஓட்டப்பம் வீட்டை சுடும்	One's deed will burn him, pancake with evil intention will burn the house
பூனை கொன்ற பாவம் உன்னோடு, வெல்லம் தின்ற பாவம் என்னோடு	Let the sin of killing the cat be with you, and let the sin of eating the jaggery stay with me
அடி நாக்கிலே நஞ்சும், நுனி நாக்கிலே அமிர்தமா ?	When you have poison in the bottom of your tongue, can there be elixir at the tip of the tongue ?
கண்டால் காமாச்சி நாயகர், காணவிட்டால் காமாட்டி நாயகர்	In front of you they would praise you like a lord. When you are away they would ridicule you as a fool
ஏறச்சொன்னால் எருதுக்குக் கோபம், இறங்கச்சொன்னால் நொண்டிக்குக் கோபம்	The bull gets angry when a physically challenged man is asked to mount on it; if the man is asked to get down, he would get angry
எருமை வாங்கும் முன் நெய் விலை கூறுகிறதா ?	Can you ask price for your ghee before buying buffalo?
ஊர் எல்லாம் வாழ்கிறது என்று வீடு எல்லாம் அழுது புரண்டாலும் வருமா ?	Would it matter if you cry rolling all over your house that the village is prospering?
குதிரை குருடானாலும், கொள்ளு தின்கிறதில் குறைய ?	Would the blind horse eat lesser fodder?
பங்குனி என்று பருக்கிறதுமில்லை, சித்திரை என்றும் சிறுக்கிறுதுமில்லை	Neither does he expand in March nor does he get lean in April
அஞ்சும் மூன்றும் உண்டானால், அறியாப்பெண்ணும் சமைக்கும்	If the five(pepper, salt, mustard, cumin, tamarind) and the three(water, fire, fuel) are at hand, even an ignorant girl can cook
இரும்பு அடிக்கிற இடத்தில நாய்க்கு என்ன வேலை ?	What work does a dog have in a blacksmith shop?
ஆசை அறுபது நாள், மோகம் முப்பது நாள், தொண்ணூறும் போனால் துடைப்பக்கட்டை	Lust for 30 days, desire for 60 days and after 90 days she looks like a broomstick
வேலியில் போகிறதை வேட்டிக்குள் விட்ட கதை	Picking some wild creature from the bush and packing it in the dhothi (referring to the unwanted activity and its consequence )
பொழப்பற்ற நாசுவன் பொண்டாட்டி தலையை செரச்சானாம்	Unemployed barber shaves his wife's head
யானை மேல் போகிறவனை சுண்ணாம்பு கேட்ட கதை	Asking for limestone from one who is travelling on an elephant
ஆபத்துக்கு பாவமில்லை	Necessity has no law
எறும்பு ஊறக் கல்லும் தேயும்	With enough ants creeping, even a stone gets worn out. (With perseverance anything is possible.)
கையில் வெண்ணையை வைத்து நெய் தேடுவது போல்	Searching for ghee with butter in hand
எள்ளென்றால் எண்ணையாய் நிற்கிறான்	You ask him for sesame seeds, he's ready with sesame oil. (Be one step ahead.)
விளக்கமாத்துக்கு பட்டுக்குஞ்சலம் போடுவது போல்	Like a silk tassle for a broom stick. (Similar to "putting lipstick on a pig".)
யானைக்கும் அடி சறுக்கும்	Even an elephant slips some times. (Even the mighty might fail sometimes.)
பகலில் பசுமாடு தெரியாதவனுக்கு இருட்டில் எருமைமாடு தெரியுமா?	He who can't spot a (white) cow in broad daylight can't spot a (black) buffallo in darkness.
