= Hebbar =

Hebbar is a Hindu surname from Karnataka in India. It is found amongst various Brahmin communities, including Chitpavan Brahmins, Deshastha Brahmins, Havyaka Brahmins, Kota Brahmins, Panchagrama Brahmins, Shivalli Brahmins, Tuluva Hebbars, Sthanika Brahminss, Smartha Brahmins and Hebbar Iyengars.

== Etymology ==
Hebbar was derived from the Kannada word, hebbu/hiridhu meaning big, and haruva which means a Brahman.

== Notable people ==
The following is a list of notable people with last name Hebbar.

- Ashwin Hebbar (born 1995), Indian cricket player
- Kattingeri Krishna Hebbar (1911–1996), Indian artist
- Nistula Hebbar (born 1975), Indian journalist
- Rajesh Hebbar (born 1967), Indian actor
- Ranjani Hebbar (1983–2013), Indian musician

== See also ==
- Malik Hebbar (born 1973), French football player
