= Tamil South Africans =

Regions with significant populations
- KwaZulu-Natal

Languages
- English, Tamil, Languages of South Africa

Religion
- Hinduism

Related ethnic groups
- Tamil diaspora, Indian diaspora, Indian South Africans, Malayalees, Tamil people, Telugu people, Tulu people, Kannada people, Tamil Mauritian, Sri Lankan Tamils, Indian Tamils of Sri Lanka, Tamil Malaysian, Singapore Tamils, Myanmar Tamils, Tamil Guyanese, Tamil Trinidadian and Tobagonian, South Indians in Fiji, Dravidians, Sri Lankan diaspora,Indian South Africans, South African Hindus

Tamil South Africans are Indian South Africans of Tamil descent. Tamil people form the majority of Indian immigrants who came as indentured labourers from India to the colony of Natal, South Africa, from 1860 onwards. After the expiry of their indenture, most of these Indians moved to the cities, becoming established as a thoroughly urban population.

== Arrival in South Africa ==
During the Dutch colonial period, people from parts of India and Ceylon were sent to the Cape as slaves. In the early 18th century, about half of the enslaved people in the Cape were from these countries. In 1677, 93 indentured people from Thootukudi (a coastal town in the southern state of Tamil Nadu) were made to go the Cape while in 1712, 36 indentured people from Ceylon were transported, and 80 in 1719. There was another shipment from Ceylon in 1754.

In 1833, the British Parliament passed the Act of Abolition, which banned slavery throughout the British Empire. The consequence of this was that many African slaves in the Colony of Natal decided to desert their former masters. The former masters, lacking sufficient labour force, persuaded the skeptical British authorities in India to implement the system of indentured labour in Natal. On 16 November 1860, 342 men, women and children arrived aboard the S.S. Truro in Port Natal (Durban).

== Apartheid ==
Apartheid alienated all Indians as disenfranchised non-whites, and Hinduism in particular was perceived by many whites as antithetical to Christianity. The imposition of apartheid system also curtailed the opportunities for improvement and included the forced removals program, causing great disruption and social hardship.

== Integration ==
Over the 150 years of residence in South Africa, participation in religion and its many festivals has brought devotees a valuable sense of identity and solidarity, especially in the light of their marginalization and the discrimination experienced under the apartheid system. A recent resurgence of interest in indigenous Tamil festivals seems to reflect a variety of religious, social and political concerns. In South Africa, the Tamil community tend to refer to their religion as "Tamil", rather than Hindu, although this blurring of the distinctions between religion and language also occurs with other Hindu ethnic groups in South Africa.

== Education ==
Tamil has been included as a high school subject for the South African Nationals Senior Certificate.

== Festivals ==
"Purataasi" is the Tamil month from mid-September to mid-October and is a period dedicated to Lord Vishnu. The entire period of Purataasi is observed with the abstention of meat, sexual pleasures and intoxicants. The main prayer in every Tamil-cultured home is held on any of the four Saturdays during the period and much effort is put into this.

The Tamil Community in South Africa also observe the Mariamman Festival in the Aadi Month which falls between mid-July and mid-August. Due to the fact that Maize Meal forms a large part in the Mariamman worship this prayer is usually referred to as "Porridge Prayers" by the locals.

Kavadi is another famous festival among the Tamil community in South Africa. Such an example is the Melrose Sri Siva Subramaniar Alayam in Johannesburg that was first a steel temple dedicated to Lord Muruga and was built in 1890 and today attracts thousands of devotees during the Thai Poosam festival.

== Notable Persons ==
- Roy Padayachie Former Cabinet Minister, Politician and Activist
- Navi Pillay, jurist, UN High Commissioner for Human Rights, and 2026 Nobel Peace Prize winner.

== See also ==
- Thai Poosam Kavady festival in South Africa
- Thai Pongal
- Tamil people
- Tamil diaspora
- Indian South Africans
