= H. K. Kesavan =

Indian academic (1926–2014)

Hiremagalur Krishnaswamy Kesavan
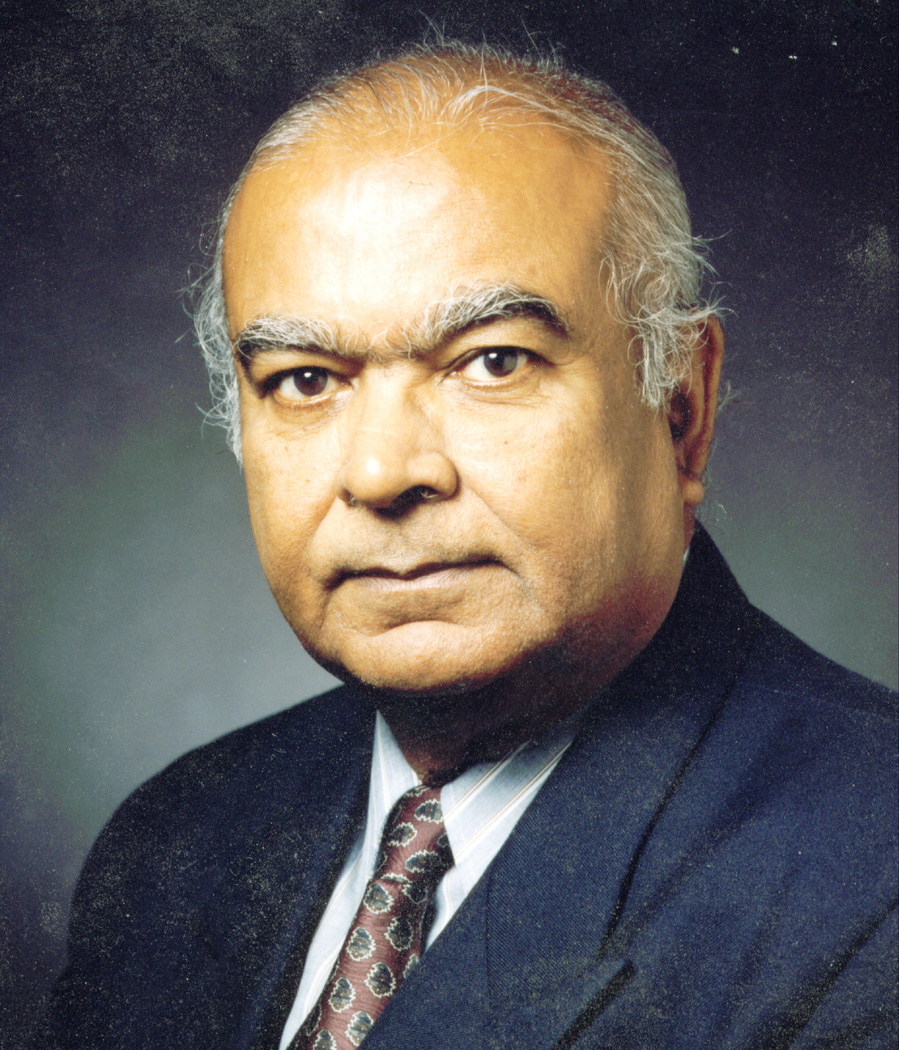
- Born: 14 June 1926; Bangalore, Mysore State (now Karnataka), India
- Died: 26 November 2014 (aged 88); Waterloo, Ontario, Canada
- Education: University Visvesvaraya College of Engineering; University of Illinois Urbana-Champaign; Michigan State University
- Known for: Linear graph theory, entropy optimization
- Scientific career
- Fields: Electrical engineering Systems theory Information theory
- Workplaces: Indian Institute of Technology, Kanpur; University of Waterloo
- Doctoral advisor: Herman E. Koenig

Hiremagalur Krishnaswamy Kesavan, known as H. K. Kesavan (14 June 1926 – 26 November 2014), was an Indian professor in the Faculty of Engineering at the University of Waterloo, Ontario, Canada.

== Early life and education ==
H.K. Kesavan was born on 14 June 1926 in Bangalore, India, to a Hindu family. He received his undergraduate degrees in science and engineering from the Central College and the Government Engineering College (now called University Visvesvaraya College of Engineering) in Bangalore. He received his M.S. degree from the University of Illinois Urbana-Champaign in 1956 and his Ph.D. from Michigan State University in 1959, both in electrical engineering. He was an instructor at Michigan State from 1956 to 1959, and assistant professor in 1959–1960.

== Career ==
=== Early career, 1960-1963 ===
In 1960, he was appointed as associate professor at the University of Waterloo, eventually serving as chairman of the Electrical Engineering department. During this time, he also spent a year back at Michigan State where he finished co-authoring his first book, Analysis of Discrete Physical Systems, co-authored with Herman Koenig and Yilmaz Tokad and published several years later.

=== IIT Kanpur, 1964-1968 ===
For a period of five years, he returned to India to serve as the first chairman of Electrical Engineering at the Indian Institute of Technology Kanpur and concurrently as head of its nationally significant Computer Centre. He was also the first Dean of Research and Development at the IIT.

=== Waterloo, 1968-1991 ===
He returned to Waterloo to serve as the founding chairman of the Department of Systems Design engineering. He has published numerous technical papers and books on systems theory, applications of linear graph theory and entropy optimization principles.

== Science and philosophy ==
Kesavan maintained a lifelong interest in the philosophical aspects of science. His book, Science and Spirituality presents a global view of Vedic philosophy from the insights that science and spirituality provide.
