= Indians in Vietnam =

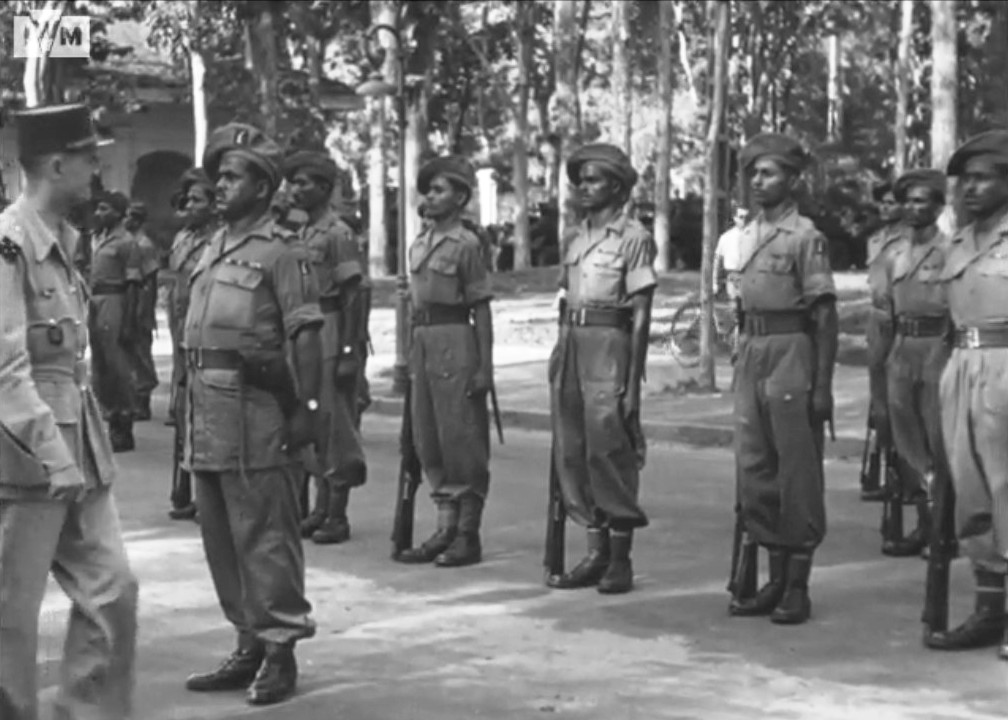
- Indian Soldiers in Saigon -1945

Total population
- 2,700 (2025)

Regions with significant populations
- Ho Chi Minh City

Languages
- Vietnamese • Tamil • English • Languages of India

Religion
- Hinduism · Buddhism · Islam · Sikhism · Religions of India

Related ethnic groups
- Overseas Indians, Khasi people, Munda people, Nicobarese

Indians in Vietnam consist of migrants to Vietnam from India, both historical and recent. As of 2011, there were about 2,000 people of Indian origin settled in Vietnam, mainly in Ho Chi Minh City. Prior to the Vietnam War, there was a vibrant Indian community consisting of primarily Tamils in Vietnam, and specifically the Chettiars.

The Cham people (remnants of the Champa Kingdom) of central Vietnam share a long history with India.

== Pre-1975 Indian-Vietnamese ==
In contemporary history, Indians began migrating to Vietnam in the late 19th century, in search for better economic prospects, and/or for colonial civil service.

Per the 1937 census by the French Indochinese colonial regime, about 2000 Indians resided in Southern Vietnam (Cochinchina), and another 1000 in Northern Vietnam (Tonkin), Central Vietnam (Annam) and Laos. An estimated 3,000 - 4,000 Indians lived in the Republic of Vietnam (South Vietnam) in the 1950s and 60s, very few to none in Communist North Vietnam after its independence in 1945. A Vietnamese source estimated that around 1000 Indians were in Saigon in the 1950s, of whom 400 were from the former French India, and the remainder were the Bombay Gujarati and Sindhi merchants. The Hindu, Muslim and Sikh faiths were represented. The majority were South Indian, and the North Indians were a visible minority. Many Indian-Vietnamese lived in Saigon, coupled with a much smaller presence in Đà Nẵng, Đà Lạt, Huế, and Nha Trang.

The Gujaratis and the Sindhis traded textile, clothing, jewelry and tailoring services; especially in Saigon, where they had many shops. The Chettiars engaged in banking, brokerage, and the rental of commercial buildings, vehicles, boats etc. The Chettiars began their return to India in 1963 due to the political instability after the 1963 coup d'état and assassination of President Ngo Dinh Diem. Tamil Muslims built several mosques in Saigon in the 1930s, including the Central Mosque (vi: Thánh Đường Đông Du (Dong Du Mosque)) (ar: Jamia Al-Musulman).

== After the Fall of Saigon ==
After the Fall of Saigon, also known as the Liberation of Saigon or Liberation of the South, the Communist regime confiscated and collectivized all private property in the South for little to no compensation, as it had done in the North since 1945. This included the confiscation of Indian-owned private properties such as homes, businesses and places of worship. The former South's free market economy was ended, as a result of the state-run economy. Foreigners were unwelcome and harassed. The Indian-Vietnamese fearing further persecution, exited Vietnam, depleting the pre-1975 Indian-Vietnamese presence. The pre-1975 Indian-Vietnamese are few in number today.

== See also ==
- India–Vietnam relations
- Hinduism in Vietnam
- Religion in Vietnam
- Julie Quang
