= Kodandarama Temple, Hiremagalur =

Kodandarama Temple
- Kondandaramaswami Devasthana
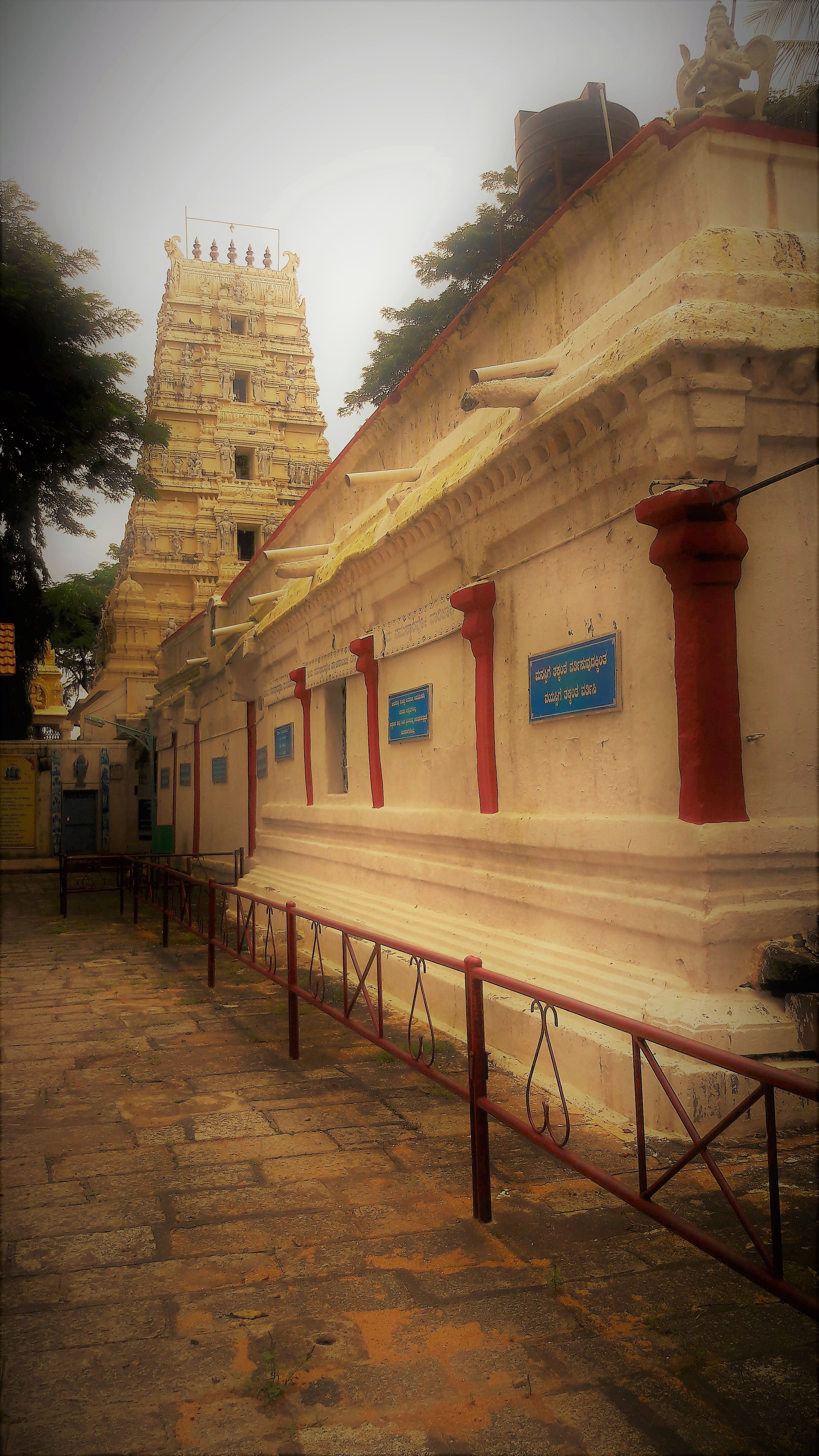

Religion
- Affiliation: Hinduism
- Deity: Rama or Kodandarama

Location
- Location: Hiremagalur
- State: Karnataka
- Country: India

Architecture
- Type: Dravidian architecture
- Completed: 14th century

Kodandaramaswami Temple (Kannada: ಕೋದಂಡರಾಮಸ್ವಾಮಿ ದೇವಸ್ಥಾನ, Kannada pronunciation: [kod̪ʌɳɖʌɾaməswami]) is a Hindu shrine located at Hiremagalur near Chikkamagaluru, in Chikkamagaluru district, Karnataka, India. The temple deity is called Kodandarama, or Rama holding his bow, named "kodanda." The main deity is also in marriage arrangement (vivaha) or Kalyana-rama, as Sita is to Rama's right, as opposed to the more common arrangement where she appears to his left. The temple is likely the oldest surviving, and continuously operating temple dedicated to Rama.

The temple is State protected and appears to have been constructed in three stages, with its murti (or main deity), garbhagrha and sukhanasi structures likely in the Ganga or Chola style. The remaining portions are additions in Hoysala and Dravidian style. The present navaranga is of the 14th century. While the mukhamandapa may be of the 16th century. The outer walls of the garbhagruha and vestibule are raised on a square basement which consists of six cornices. The outer walls of the navaranga and mukhamandapa are built with brick and mortar. The projection of the vestibule appears to be of the 17th century. A new stone exterior wall was installed in 2024.

== Temple contents ==
Image of presiding deity

In the garbhagrha on a common Hanuman pedestal, 1.5 ft high, there are idols of Kodandarama with Sita to his right and Lakshmana to his left. Rama and Lakshmana carry the arrows in their right hands and strung bows in their left hands. Typically, an idol of Hanuman accompanies images of Rama, but according to legend, the scene depicted of the presiding deity is situated at a time before Rama and Hanuman have met. The image of Hanuman was likely added to the pedestal for ritual sanctification purposes as worship of Rama is inappropriate without Hanuman.

In the prakara (enclosure) of the temple, there are small shrines containing the figures of Yoganarasimha, Sugriva, Kalinga, Mardhana, Ramanujacharya, Madhvacharya, Vedanta Desika, and some alwars. Yoganarasimha, so called because his meditation posture, measures 1.06 metres (3½ ft.) high having a prabhavati on which the 10 incarnations are sculpted. But after Rama, Balarama and Krishna are engraved, with the Buddha missing. This is common in many Srivaishnava representations of dashavataras as they give prominence to Balarama, here measuring 4 ft. with four hands and in a pre-Hoysala style, resembling Badami Chalukya workmanship. While his right lower hand has a short round staff, the lower left is placed on the waist. The outer-walls of the garbhagrha and sukansi have, besides pilasters and turrets, two rows of figures representing mostly Vishnu and his Avatars such as Hayagriva, Narasimha, Lakshminarayana, Venugopala, Kalinga-Mardana and Govardhanadhari. There are also figures of Lakshmi, Hanuman, Garuda and Ganapati. There is a beautiful murti on the Gopuram near the entrance of Agni bhagavan with two heads, seven tongues and three legs. A yatra of Kodandarama temple is held for one day during February–March each year. The temple had a pond nearby which is now dry.

== Legend ==
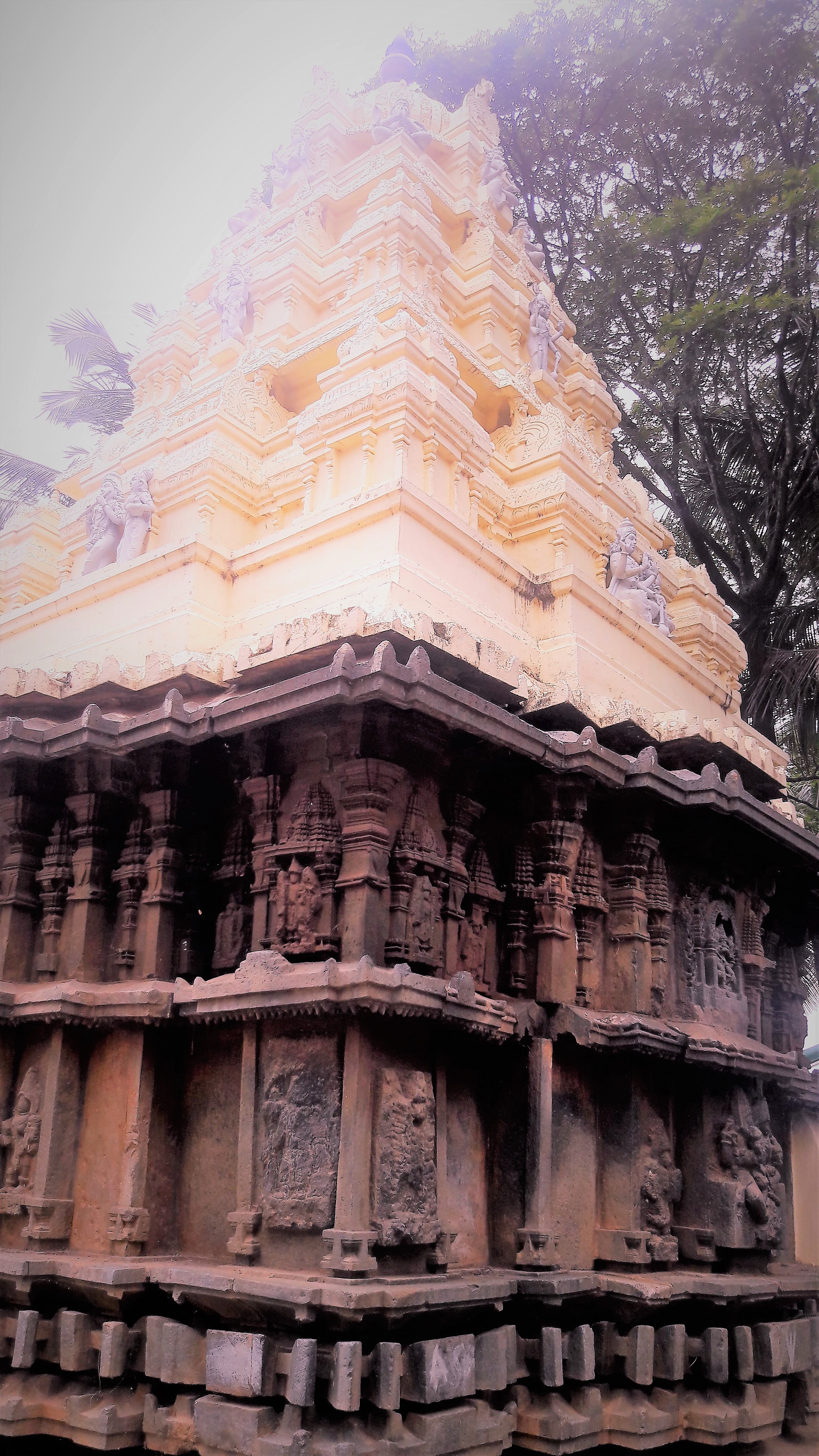
Image of presiding deity

According to sthalapurana, or local legend, proud Parashurama was subdued at Hiremagalur by Rama. Parashurama requested Rama to show him the scene of his (Rama's) marriage. Therefore, Sita stands to Rama's right side and Lakshmana to his left, as per the tradition in Hindu marriage ceremonies. Sita and Lakshmana are positioned like this, as popular renderings of the trio (Rama, Lakshmana, and Sita) depict Sita to Rama's left and this could also be seen in Sri Kodanda Rama Temple, Chunchunakatte, K.R. Nagara Taluk, Mysuru District. The idols are best described by the poet Sri. Da. Ra. Bendre: "All the three idols appear to be walking towards the viewer looking at the placement of their feet. The sculptor has carved intricately the crown, jewellery and the positions of the bodies. Sita’s posture, eyes looking down, her jewellery are sculpted really well."

Legends say that the place was the residence of nine siddhas who performed penance near a pond in the village known as Siddha Pushkarni and that as Parashurama too lived here, it was called Bhargavapuri, or "town of Bhargava" (Parashurama).
