= Hinduism in South Africa =

South African Hindus
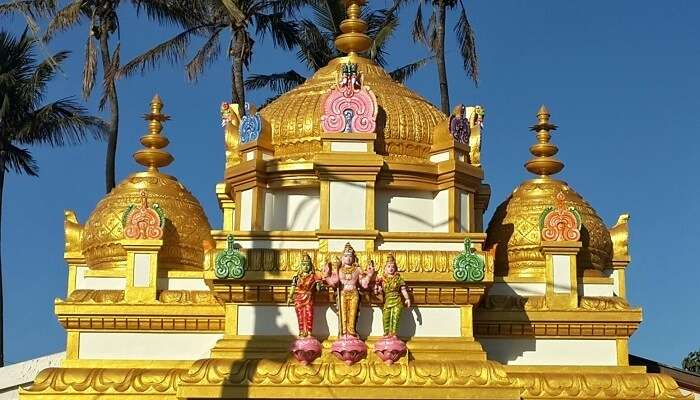
- Clairwood Shree Siva Temple, Durban

Total population
- ▲682,302 (2022) ▲1.1% of the total population

Religions
- Hinduism

Scriptures
- Vedas, Upanishads, Puranas, Ramayana (incl. Ramcharitmanas version), Mahabharata (incl. Bhagavad Gita), Sangam literature

Languages
- Sacred; Sanskrit, Old Tamil Regional; English, Afrikaans, Zulu, Xhosa Others; Hindi, Tamil, Telugu, Awadhi, Bhojpuri (Naitali), Gujarati, Bengali, Sindhi, etc. (among diaspora)

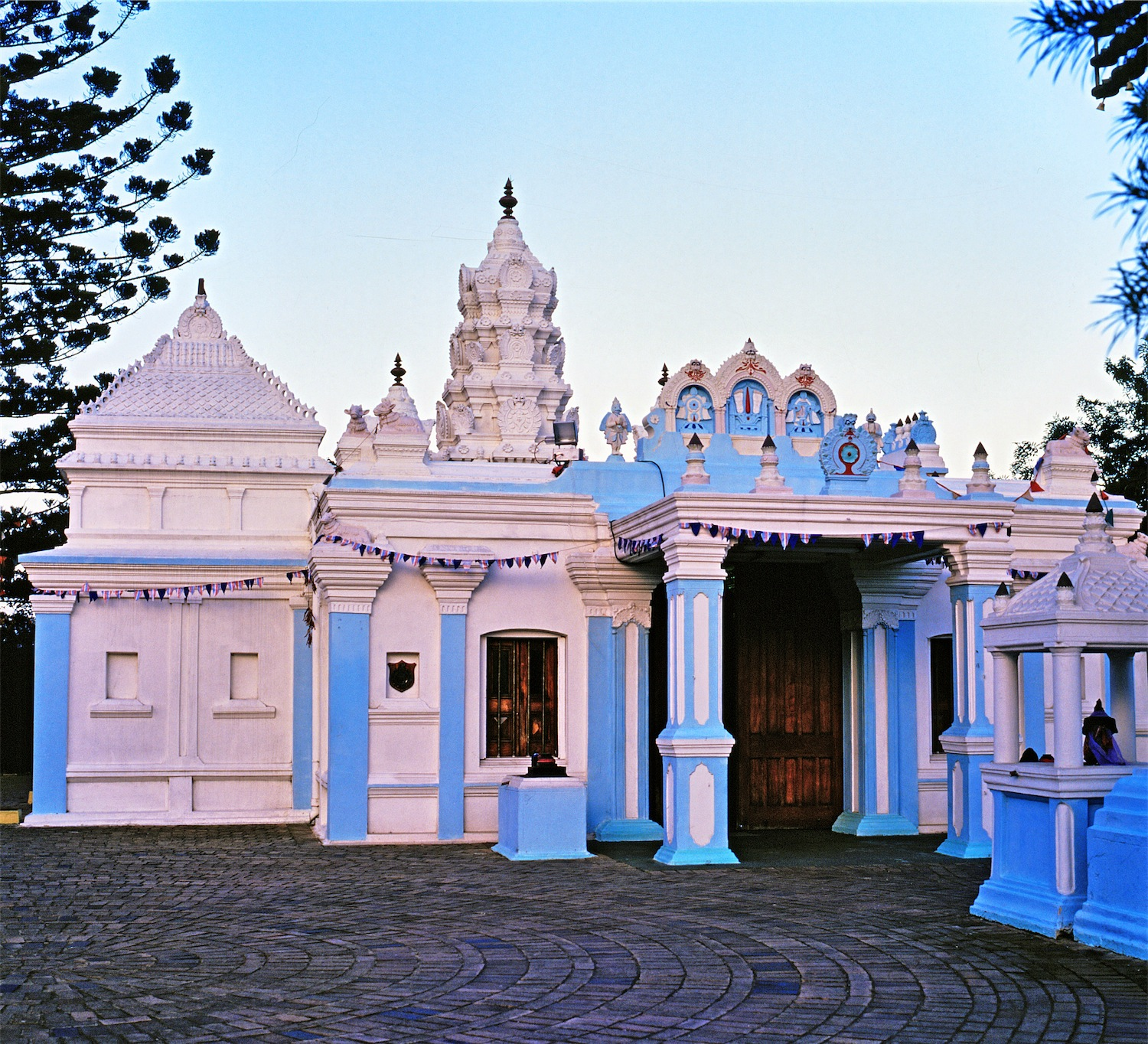
A Hindu Temple in Durban, South Africa.

Hinduism is practised throughout South Africa, but primarily in KwaZulu-Natal. Approximately 1.1% of the South African population professed to be Hindu, according to the 2022 census. This is down from the 1.4% based on the 1996 census.

Nevertheless, the population has been increasing in absolute terms from 551,669 in 2001 to 569,476 in 2011, and 682,302 in 2022, and by this measure, South Africa has the largest concentration of Hindus in Africa after Mauritius.

Year	Percent	Increase
1994	1.4%	-
2001	1.22%	-0.18%
2011	1.1%	-0.12%
2013*	1.0%	-0.1%
2016*	0.9%	-0.1%
2022	1.1%	+0.2%

*The figures for 2013 and 2016 are not official census data.

The majority of Hindus in South Africa are Indian South Africans, largely descendants of indentured laborers who migrated under the British colonial government, from 1860 to 1919, to work in plantations and the mining operations owned by European settlers. Many came from Tamil Nadu, Gujarat, Maharashtra, Uttar Pradesh, Bihar and other states of India. Because of their Indian descent, Hindu settlers in South Africa suffered discrimination, abuse and persecution during the colonial and Apartheid eras.

The first Hindu temples were in operation in the 1870s. Some South African local governments banned temple building and property ownership by Hindus in 1910s. Modern South Africa has many Hindu temples, and its Hindu community observes major festivals of Hinduism such as Deepavali.

== History ==
There is an ongoing controversy about the first arrival of Hindus in modern South Africa. One school of scholars state that Indians first arrived in modern South Africa during colonial era as indentured servants for the British Empire. The second school states Indians arrived between 500-900 AD about the same time as Islamic traders arrived. The third school states that Hindus very likely arrived by 1st millennium BC, or possible before. The third school's uses indirect linguistic, literary and gold mining process technology evidence to support its theory, while there is ample additional archaeological and historical evidence for the first two schools.

A number of ancient Indian texts describe shipping and trade. Kautiliya's Arthashastra dedicates a chapter to it, and mentions a government official called navadhyaksha, or minister of shipping whose job was to capture and prosecute pirates, manage sea ports and collect custom duties. Wilfred Schoff's work provides evidence of a chain of active trading ports along east and west Indian coasts by 1st century BC. While there is extensive evidence for the presence of Hindu traders and merchants in Mozambique and Swahili coast (Tanzania, Kenya), archaeological evidence has not been found for any shipping or trading in ancient times, including those by Hindus from India, along the coast of modern South Africa. Bruno Werz states that this is likely because the coastal region of Mozambique and Swahili coasts are calmer and offer many natural ports that fall is natural trade winds between India and Africa, in contrast to the more turbulent coast and seas around South Africa. Hromnik states that the likely path was arrival in Mozambique, followed by a land route inland into gold mining areas belonging to Shona people in Zimbabwe to South Africa. Regardless of the era when Hindus first arrived in South Africa, their numbers were small and they were limited to the coastal or urban regions before the colonial era.

=== Colonial era, indentured labourers ===
Large numbers of Hindus (as well as people of other religions) began arriving into South Africa in the 19th century colonial era, mostly as indentured labor and some on their own as "free" immigrants. After slavery was abolished throughout the British Empire by 1833, British mining companies and European plantation owners throughout the empire were short of cheap or free skilled labour for labor-intensive sugarcane plantations and mining work. The available local labour became difficult to retain for low salary, harsh work, and thus unreliable. The British Empire invented and enforced an indentured labor system which essentially retained all elements of slavery.

The new system, also called the 'coolie system', was extensively used to bring Hindus to South Africa and other parts of British empire. The system enticed extremely poor people in India to sign a contract wherein they would be promised paid travel and a livelihood in exchange for a binding promise to work for a fixed period of time (four to seven years was common). Any indentured laborer who left before the contract ended was considered a criminal and subject to a prison term.

When the indentured labor law was designed, it provided the indentured laborer some rights at the end of the contract; the laborer became free, with the legal right to some land and the right to stay in the new land, or demand the company or plantation owner for pre-paid travel back. However, in late 1880s South Africa, new laws were passed that required that the newly freed indentured laborer pay a hefty tax, or sign a new indentured labor contract and escape the tax. About 25% of Hindus returned to India, once their first contract was over. But for most indentured Hindu laborers, they had lost all contact with their country of origin, chose to stay and signed a new indentured contract. It is this system that brought large number of Hindus (and Southeast Asians) into South Africa.

The first ships carrying indentured Hindu labourers for plantations in British Empire left India in 1836. While some Hindus were recruited legally, many others were kidnapped or "blackbirded" into long-term indentured service in various parts of British Empire, ranging from South Africa to Fiji, Australia and the Caribbean.

In South Africa, indentured labourers were brought in to work on sugarcane plantations in Natal, in part because sugarcane farming and sugar had its origins in India, the labor did not need to be trained, and Indian Hindus were suffering from waves of famines and extreme poverty while British colonial empire was busy force converting India's fertile farms from the production of food to the production of cash crops such as cotton for British mills, tobacco for Europeans, poppy and opium for China. Today, the Kwa-Zulu Natal province of South Africa has the largest Hindu population in Africa (about 12% of Kwa-Zulu Natal province's total population).

In the early decades of the migrations, indentured Indians were treated as inhumanely as the enslaved Africans had been. They were confined to their estates and paid a pitiful salary. Any breach of contract brought automatic criminal penalties and imprisonment. Many of these were brought away from their homelands deceptively, from inland regions far from seaports where they were promised jobs but were not told the work they were being hired for, nor that the new job required them to leave their homeland and communities. They were hustled aboard waiting ships, unprepared for the long and arduous four-month sea journey. Abuse, disease and death on these ship, and in plantations of South Africa were common place. The abuse led to a temporary ban on indenture labor hiring in South Africa in early 1870s.

=== Establishment of Hinduism in South Africa ===
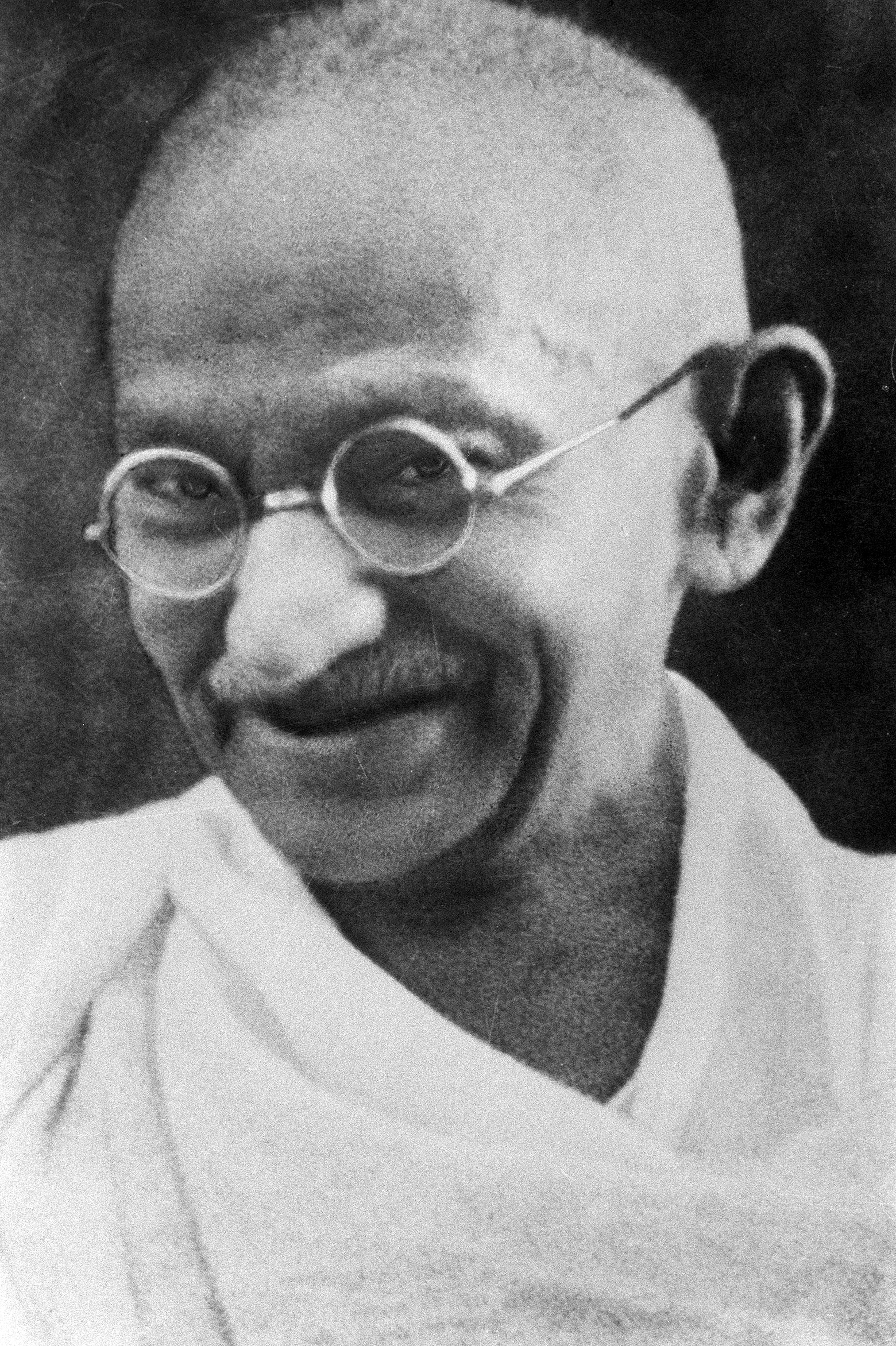
Mahatma Gandhi's resolve to apply Hindu principles of non-violence for peaceful transformation of society took shape in South Africa.

After the ban was lifted with British Colonial Law 19 and 20 of 1874, British officials advertised plantation job opportunities to Hindu families in northern Ganges basin and southern Tamil Nadu, invited men to bring their families, promised salary with homes, and that they and their families can continue to practice Hinduism while they work at the plantations. However, once they arrived, there were many irregularities and the reality after arrival was very different than promises before their departure.

Between 1874 and 1911, European plantation and factory owners in Natal region of South Africa alone brought in 146,000 people from India in 364 ships. Other Hindu coolies (indentured laborers) were deployed by the colonial government in Eastern Cape, Western Cape and Free State. Over time, the colonial government recognized three classes of Hindus - the "free" merchant class Hindus who had arrived in South Africa at their own expense, the previously indentured but later free Hindus who typically staffed shops and logistics, and the "non-free" indentured class of Hindus whose residence and movement was controlled because he or she was contracted property. The first two classes of Indian Hindus prospered and became wealthy, and were increasingly seen as economic threats by European merchants by late 1880s.

Discriminatory laws based on ethnic origin began to be passed in 1890s, and the roots of South African apartheid era started taking shape. It was in this environment of 1890s when Mahatma Gandhi arrived in South Africa as a lawyer offering services to Indian diaspora in South Africa. It was his experiences of colonial abuse, religious stereotyping and racial discrimination against poor Hindus in South Africa that shaped his political and non-violent movement. He, along with other Hindus in Pretoria, began a series of publications and Hindu organizations to bring Hindu community together, and then non-violently highlight and seek human rights. Not only did they demand civil rights to transform interracial relations, they also sought social reforms among Hindus living in South Africa.

== Hindu temples ==
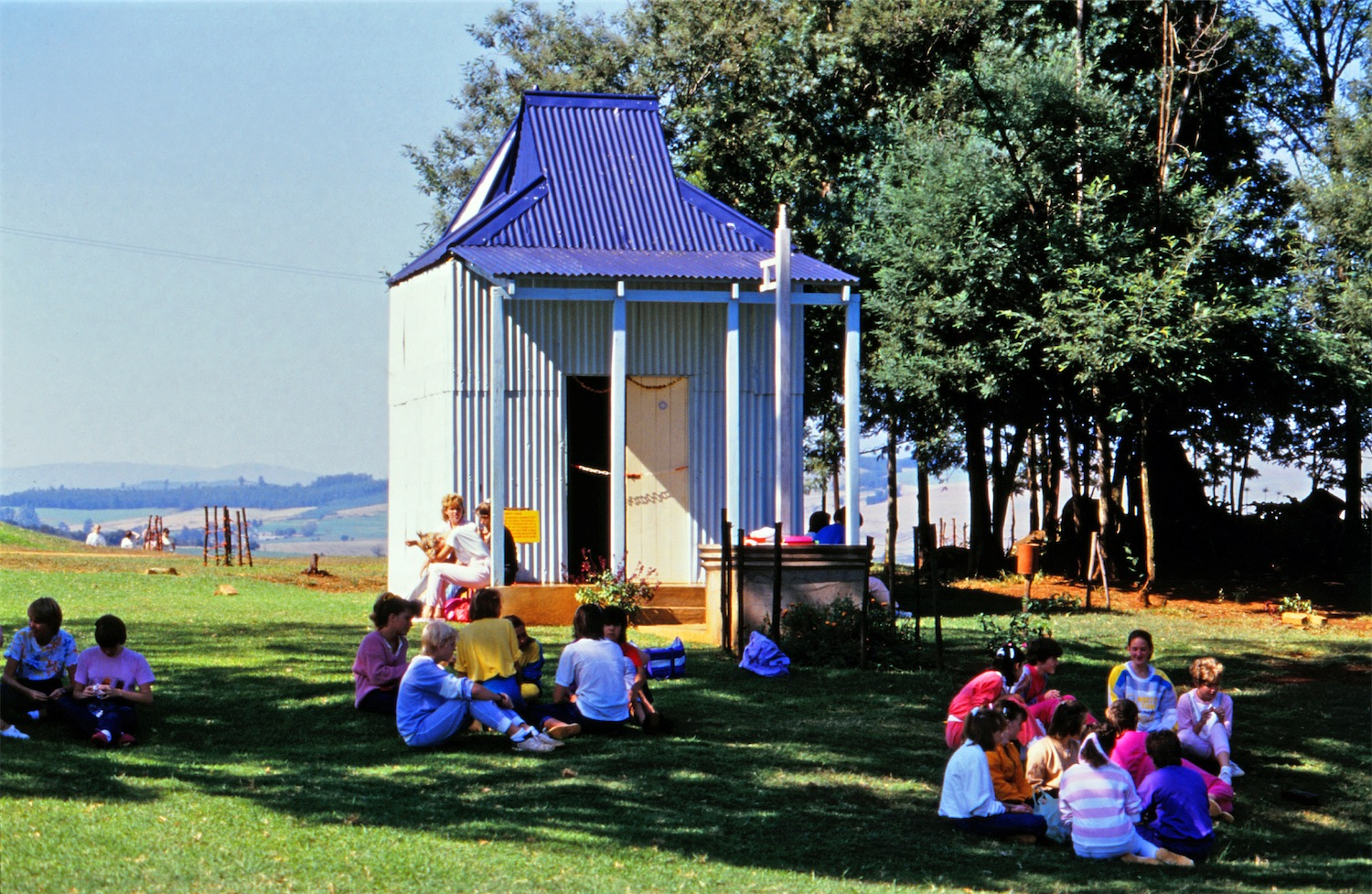
The first Hindu Temple in South Africa (above) was a very simple design. It was built in 1869, and is now a Protected Site by South African government.

The first South African Hindu temple was built in 1869. As the "free" Hindu community prospered, more temples were built in Durban, Pietermaritzburg, Port Elizabeth, Johannesburg and Pretoria. However, given the Hindus in South Africa came from different regions of India and spoke different languages, the temples and social life among Hindus remained diverse and fragmented. As apartheid-type discriminatory laws against colored and black people began to catch the imagination of some European settlers in South Africa, a few regional governments banned Hindus from purchasing land or building new temples in 1902. Additional and more severe restrictions were placed against Hindus in South Africa during the Apartheid era, through 1994.

Tamil Hindus had a well frequented First River (Umbilo Shri Ambalavanaar) temple on Umbilo river in Durban by 1875. This temple was damaged by floods in 1905, but its deities and relocatable parts were saved before the floods and relocated nearby to Second River temple, one that has remained in use for over 100 years. The early temples in South Africa were simple, but followed the traditional Hindu temple design and architectures. Temples built later were larger and more elaborate.

== Practices ==
In South Africa, there is some blurring between language, and religion among Hindus. It is not uncommon for Tamils to call their religion "the Tamil religion", or for Hindi speakers to refer to their religion likewise. In general, worship of Mother Goddess Parvati and Lord Sri Shiva are more common among Hindus of South Indian origin, with Hindus of North Indian origin worshiping Rama, or in the case of Gujaratis, worshippers of Vishnu. However, there are many practices that are fluidly shared amongst all Hindus in South Africa.

Deepavali or Diwali is the most important festival for South African Hindus. It is a major attraction in Durban, where public festivities are held every year along its beachfront. Tamil Hindus of South Africa also observe Kavadi, while Krishna devotees observe the Festival of Chariots.

According to a research, more than 88% of Hindus affirmed a monotheistic understanding of God in Hinduism as opposed to only about 11% admitting to polytheistic notions.

== Ethnicity ==
Distribution of Hindus among Ethnic groups
Ethnicity	Percent
Indian/Asian	95.6%
Black	2.9%
Coloured	1%
White	0.5%

Majority of the Hindus in South Africa are Indian South Africans. The proportion of Indian South Africans following Hinduism has decreased from 50% in 1996 to 47.27% in 2001. This further decreased to 41.3% in 2016, mainly due to the conversion of Hindus by the Christian missionaries.

== Conversions ==
The Indian Christian number grew from 4% in 1925 to 24.4% in 2011. The penetration of the Pentecostal movements into Hindu society is felt especially in the KwaZulu-Natal Indian townships. The conversions were usually connected to social identity. They converted successfully by criticising caste, emphasis on healing, and exorcism. In 2018, an organisation called the "South African Hindu Dharma Sabha" officially "declared war on such religious conversion". Its president, Ram Maharaj, said at least 500,000 signatures were needed by the Netherlands-based foundation to start legal proceedings at the International Court of Human Rights, however Maharaj's stance was rejected by other Hindu organisations in South Africa.

== See also ==
- Thai Poosam Kavady annual festival
- Indian South Africans
- Religion in South Africa
- Hindu eschatology
