= Tamil diaspora =

Descendants of Tamil immigrants in other countries

புலம்பெயர் தமிழர்
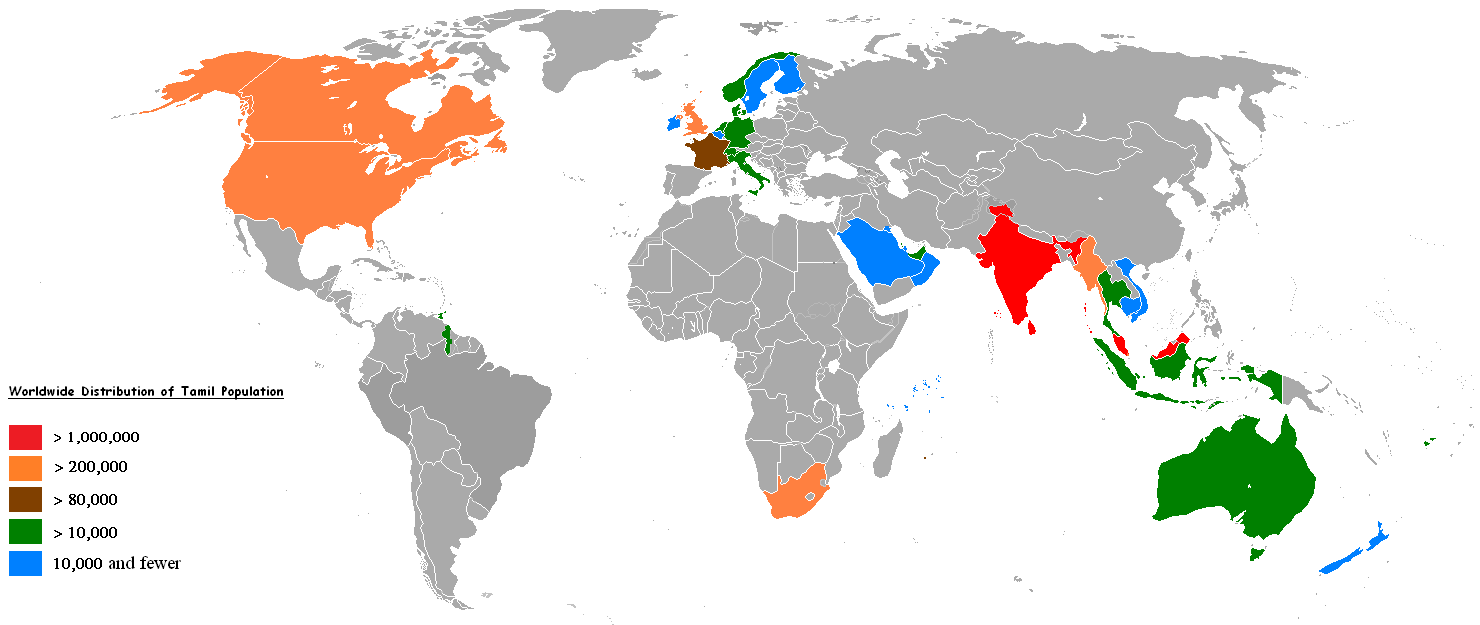

Total population
- c. 5 million (Including both Indian & Sri Lankan Tamil Diaspora)
- Malaysia: ~1,897,000
- South Africa: ~600,000 (2013)
- United Arab Emirates: ~400,000
- United States: ~356,000 (2023) (Note: Statistic includes all speakers of the Tamil language, as many multi-generation individuals do not speak the language as a mother tongue, but instead as a second or third language.)
- Saudi Arabia: ~350,000
- France (Note: Includes Overseas France, especially Réunion.): ~302,000
- United Kingdom: ~250,000 - 300,000 (2009)
- Canada: 237,599 (2021) (Note: Statistic includes all speakers of the Tamil language, as many multi-generation individuals do not speak the language as a mother tongue, but instead as a second or third language.)
- Singapore: 198,449 (2020) (Note: This number does not include the 1.64 million "non-resident population": foreigners working, studying or living in Singapore without permanent residence. It only includes the 5.69 million citizens and permanent residents living in Singapore.)
- Germany: ~80,000 (2022)
- Indonesia: ~75,000 (2008)
- Mauritius: ~72,089 (2011)
- Australia: ~50,000 (2011)
- Switzerland: ~35,000 (2006)
- Italy: ~25,000 (2005)
- New Zealand: ~12,474 (2023)
- Norway: ~20,000 - 25,000 (2024)
- Denmark: ~9,000 (2003)

Languages
- Tamil; English; languages of other countries in the diaspora

Religion
- Hinduism (Majority) Christianity Islam

The Tamil diaspora refers to descendants of the Tamil speaking immigrants who emigrated from their native lands in the southern Indian subcontinent (Tamil Nadu, Puducherry and Sri Lanka) to other parts of the world. They are found primarily in Malaysia, Arab states of the Persian Gulf, South Africa, North America, Western Europe, and Singapore. It can be divided into two main diasporic clusters, due to geographical, historical and cultural reasons, as Indian Tamil diaspora and Sri Lankan Tamil diaspora.

Four groups make up the bulk of the Tamil diaspora: colonial-era descendants of migrants to Southeast Asia, South Africa, East Africa, the Caribbean, and Fiji; recent, educated Tamil immigrants primarily to the U.S., Australia, and the U.K.; Sri Lankan Tamil refugees who resettled primarily in Canada, Western and Northern Europe, and Oceania between the 1980s and 2010s; and recent Tamil migration to the Gulf states of the Middle East as labor.

== Early migrations ==
Tamils have a long tradition of seafaring and a history of overseas migration to foreign lands due to close proximity to the Indian Ocean throughout ancient and medieval times. Many of the Tamil emigrants who left the shores of Tamil Nadu before the 18th century mixed with other ethnicities in other regions. In the medieval period Tamils emigrated as soldiers, traders and laborers settled in Kerala (specially Palakkad), Karnataka, Maharashtra, Sri Lanka, Thailand, Malaysia, Indonesia and intermixed well with the local population, while few communities still maintain their language and culture. Many groups still claim descent from medieval-era Tamil emigrants such as the Thigalas, Hebbars of Karnataka who have resided in Karnataka for generations and even adopted Kannada as their mother tongue, Palakkad Iyers of Kerala, Kaikadis of Maharashtra, Chittys of Malaysia and Giravaru and tivaru people one of the oldest settlement in Maldives and some section of the Sri Lankan Tamils and Sinhaleses such as the Sri Lankan Chetties, the Bharatha people, the Karavas, the Duravas, the Demala Gattaras and the Salagamas.

An early emigrant group that is not well documented is the Tamil Muslims who emigrated in considerable numbers to the Sultanate of Malacca (in present-day Malaysia) and were instrumental in spreading Islam amongst the indigenous Malays. Some are descended from immigrants from Arabia (Middle East), likely from the Hadhramaut region.

== British, French, and Dutch indentured workers and others ==
Sri Kandaswamy Temple, Brickfields, Malaysia.

During this period the British, Dutch, French, Portuguese and Danish colony administrators recruited many local Tamils and took them to their overseas colonies to work as laborers, petty administration officers, and in clerical and military duties.

In the 19th century, the Tamil region of the Madras Presidency was affected by severe famines, such as the Great Famine of 1876–78, and as such the region was both politically and economically weak. The British thus made use of hungry Tamil workers for their plantations all over the world - Malaysia, Singapore, Myanmar, Mauritius, South Africa, Kenya, Tanzania, Fiji and also Sri Lanka (unrelated to Tamils who migrated to Sri Lanka before the 18th century).

Some of the Tamil groups (especially the Chettiyars, Pillais, Muslims) emigrated as commercial migrants. They then dominated the trade and finance in Myanmar, Malaysia, Singapore, Sri Lanka, Mauritius, South Africa, Kenya, Tanzania and other places. The first Indian to own a merchant ship during the British times comes from this group.

These Tamilians integrated and assimilated well with their adopted countries, and became well integrated into local populations in Mauritius, South Africa, Guyana, and Fiji. On the other hand, Karnataka Tamils of Karnataka, Indian Tamils of Sri Lanka of Sri Lanka, and Tamil Malaysians of Malaysia were evolved into distinct communities of their own with unique multilingual sub-culture and identity.

Many also left to work in the possessions of the French Empire via its holdings in Pondichéry in Réunion and the French Caribbean islands of Martinique and Guadeloupe (see Malabars). A large mass of coolies and merchants was hired by the Dutch colonial government in the Dutch East Indies (present-day Indonesia) to work in East Sumatra and Batavia (now Jakarta) via Nagapattinam and Pulicat ports. Roughly about 80,000 to 100,000 (est.) descendants of these immigrants are still exist in Medan, North Sumatra and Jakarta.

Many independent Tamil merchant guilds, such as the Nagarathar, also left for these areas in an age-old tradition of their ancestors who had traded in these areas for the last 2,000 years. Britain also hired many Sri Lankan Tamils as clerical and other white-collar workers, especially in Malaysia and Singapore. All these different streams have combined to create vibrant Tamil communities in these countries.

Also, many Tamils from India and Sri Lanka migrated to the Crown colony of Singapore and British Malaya as laborers, army clerks and merchants.

== Twentieth century ==
=== Return migration from Sri Lanka and Burma ===
During and after the devastation of WW2, many Tamils and other Indians from Burma fled to India to Manipur, and Tamil Nadu. They established Burmese refugee colonies that still exist today and maintain an identity as Burmese returnees. In Sri Lanka the Sinhalese nationalist SLFP party disfranchised all Indian origin Indian Tamils of Sri Lanka and returned 600,000 back to India under the Srimavo-Shastri Pact signed between India and Sri Lanka. Many were repatriated to the Nilgiris region's tea estates. They too maintain a distinct identity as Ceylon returnees in Tamil Nadu. Black July has created another stream of Sri Lankan and Indian Tamils of Sri Lanka refugees in India who have languished for the last 20 years in refugee camps throughout Tamil Nadu while many others have integrated with the mainstream community or left India for other countries in the west.

There is also a movement of native Sri Lankan Tamils to India; some migrated to do white-collar jobs during the British days, but there has been a much bigger diaspora today.

=== Post-1983 dispersal of Sri Lankan Tamils ===
The Sri Lankan Tamil diaspora was well established in Malaysia, Singapore and the United Kingdom prior to the 1983 Black July induced dispersal of refugees and asylum claimants in India, Europe, and Canada. Although relatively recent in origin, this subgroup had well-established communities in these host countries prior to the 1983 pogroms.

=== 20th century dispersal of Tamils from India ===
In the second half of the 20th century, Tamils from India migrated as skilled professionals to various parts of India and countries like UAE, Qatar, Bahrain, Saudi Arabia, UK, USA, Singapore and so on. Some of them got citizenship of respective countries but still having strong family and cultural ties with Tamil Nadu, than those who migrated before 1950, who lost touch with their ancestral links in Tamil Nadu.

== By region ==
=== Africa ===
==== Mainland Africa ====
There is a significant number of Tamils in Africa, especially Kenya. At least 30% of the Tamils in Africa live in Kenya, followed by Uganda. Most of these people are migrants, while some have been living there for generations.

==== South Africa ====
Tamil migration to South Africa started as from 1860, first as indentured labor and in the first batch 340 Tamils were there. Now there are more than 250,000 Tamils spread over in many cities, the concentration being in Natal and Durban.

In South Africa the Tamil Language can be taken in many schools as a Second Additional Language, It is recognised as a level 4 subject and carries points for entrance into university.

==== Mauritius ====
Mauritius has a Tamil population of 80,000. Most arrived from Tamil Nadu after 1835, shortly after slavery was abolished, to replace the freed African and malgache slaves, to serve as indentured laborers on the sugar cane plantations. Tamil culture has flourished in Mauritius. Since 1835, the Tamil community has built almost 125 Tamil temples and Murugan is a popular deity. Tamil holidays and festivals such as Tamil New Year Varusha Pirapu, Pongal, Timiti and Thaipusam are celebrated on a national level. Thiruvalluvar and Bharathi days are also celebrated while Deepavali, Thaipusam, Maha Shivaratri and Pongal are public holidays. But most of the people in Mauritius do not speak Tamil.

The Tamil language is taught in approximately 100 primary schools. Tamil language and literature can be studied at university level to obtain B.A. and M.A. degrees. The Mahatma Gandhi Institute promotes the Indian languages which are present in Mauritius. Tamils are attempting to include their religion and other Hindu practices. Once Tamil priests came from Jaffna in Sri Lanka, they conducted prayers in Tamil. Later, some scholars started to facilitate the population to get access to sacred books. This helped the people to learn Tamil holy Enchantment from Thevarams and Thiruvasagam

==== Réunion ====
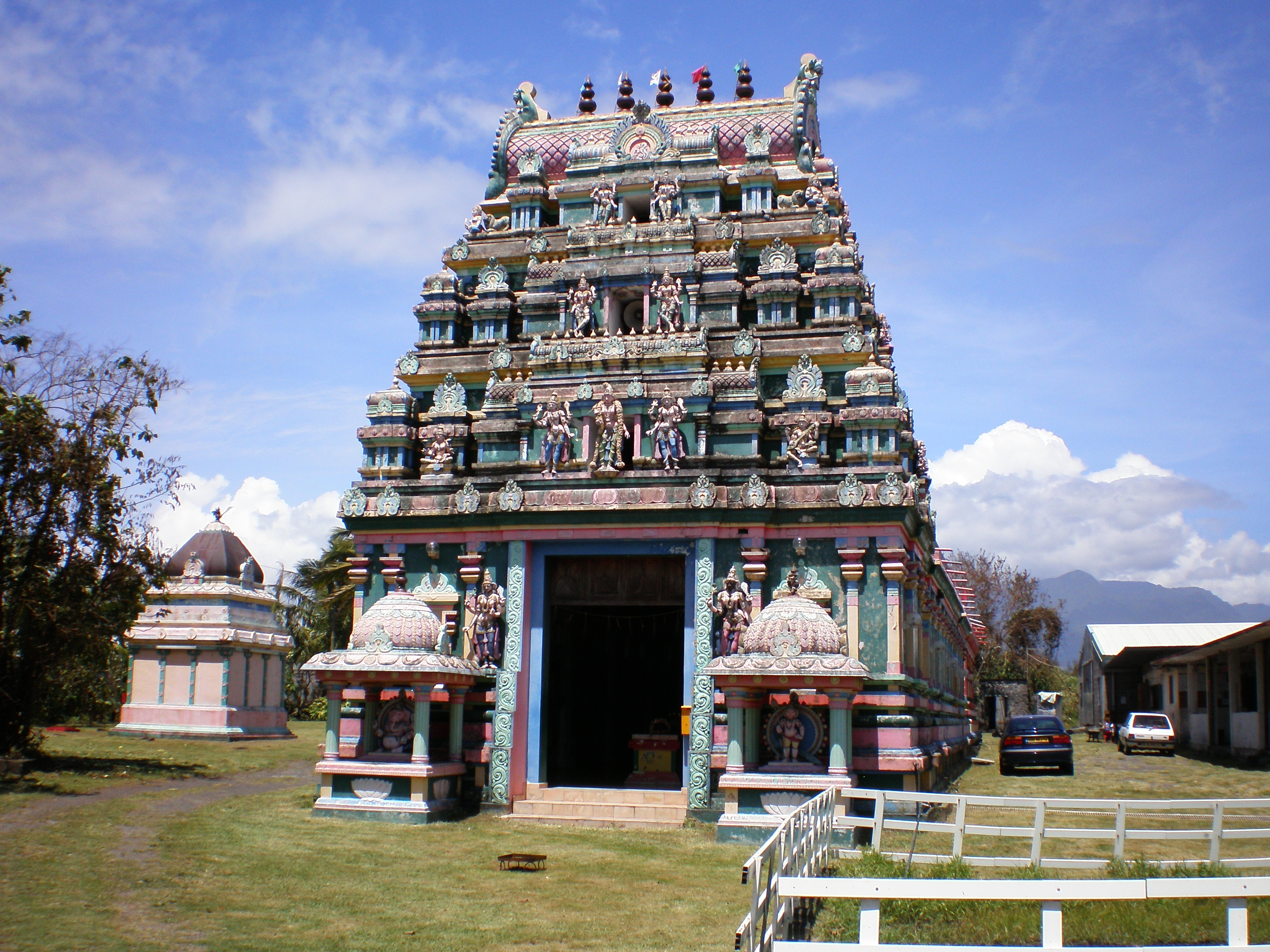
A Malbar temple in Réunion.

Tamil settlement in the French department of Réunion started as far back as 1848 as indentured labor, mainly from Pondichéry and Karaikal, the French territories in Southern India. There are now about 126,000 Tamils living in Réunion or "Malabars" as they are known there with many Hindu temples run by voluntary organisations where Hindu and Tamil cultural links are preserved well.

==== Seychelles ====
Tamil traders from Pondicherry used to visit the Seychelles for purposes of timber trade followed by settlements of Tamils from Tamil Nadu for trading purposes. Later, a trading community was in place here mainly of Tamils and many of them got integrated with the local community. Now there about 4000 Tamils in the trading business as well as in other professions.

=== Americas ===
==== Canada ====
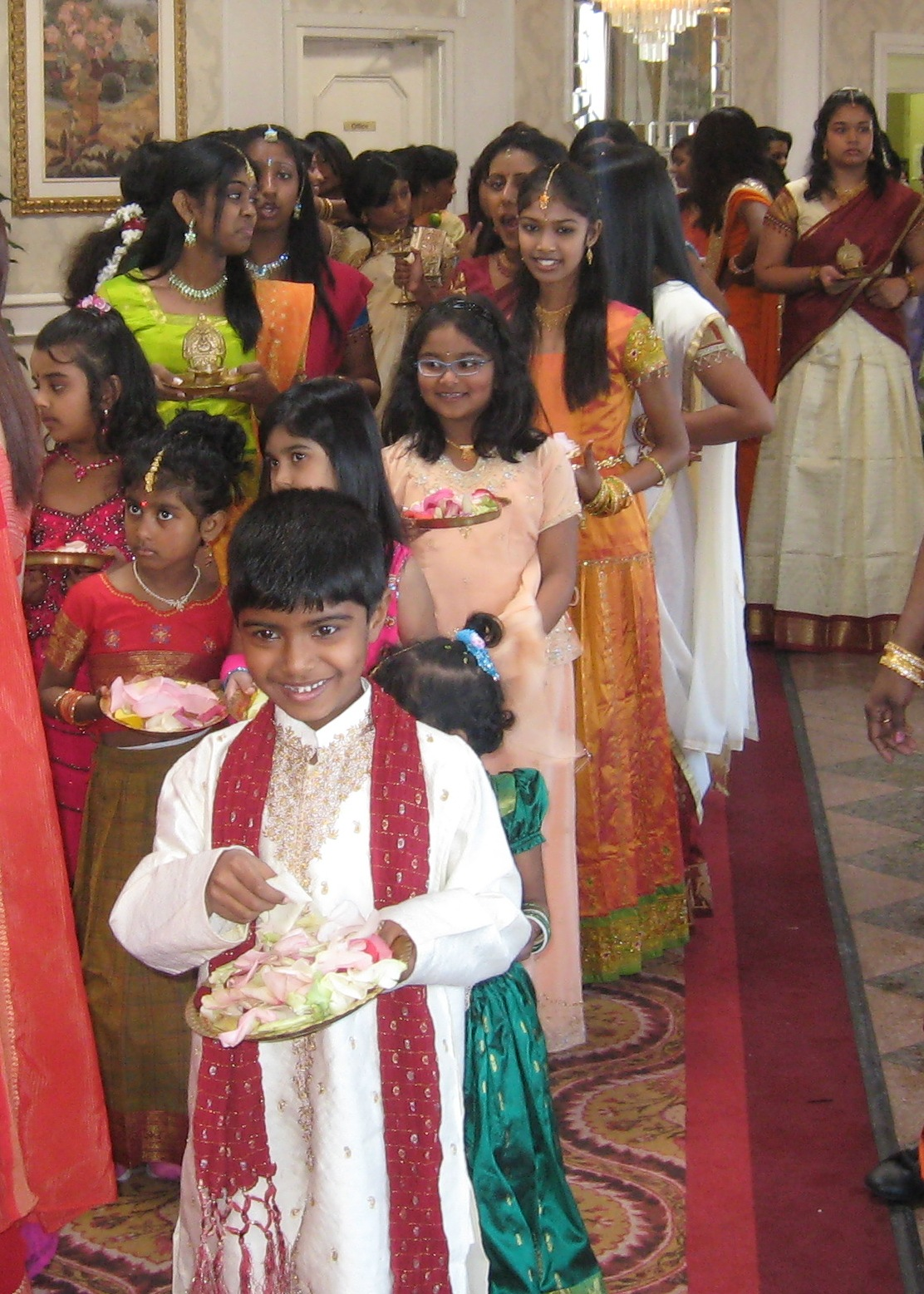
Expatriate Sri Lankan Tamil children in traditional clothes in Toronto, Ontario, Canada

As per the 2021 Canadian census, Tamil Canadians number approximately 240,000 and account for roughly 0.7% of Canada's population. A large majority of Tamil Canadians consist of Sri Lankan Tamils. The 2021 census also recorded Tamil as the largest South Asian mother tongue in Toronto. While Tamil populations exist in all provinces and territories, the largest concentrations exist in Southern Ontario, Lower Mainland, and Calgary-Edmonton Corridor. Since the 1970s, Tamils have opened numerous businesses, shops, places of worship, and service-based organizations that cater to the community. They also host yearly major events, such as street festivals and cultural events. Several Tamil cinema celebrities have hosted major musical and film-based events in major Canadian cities.

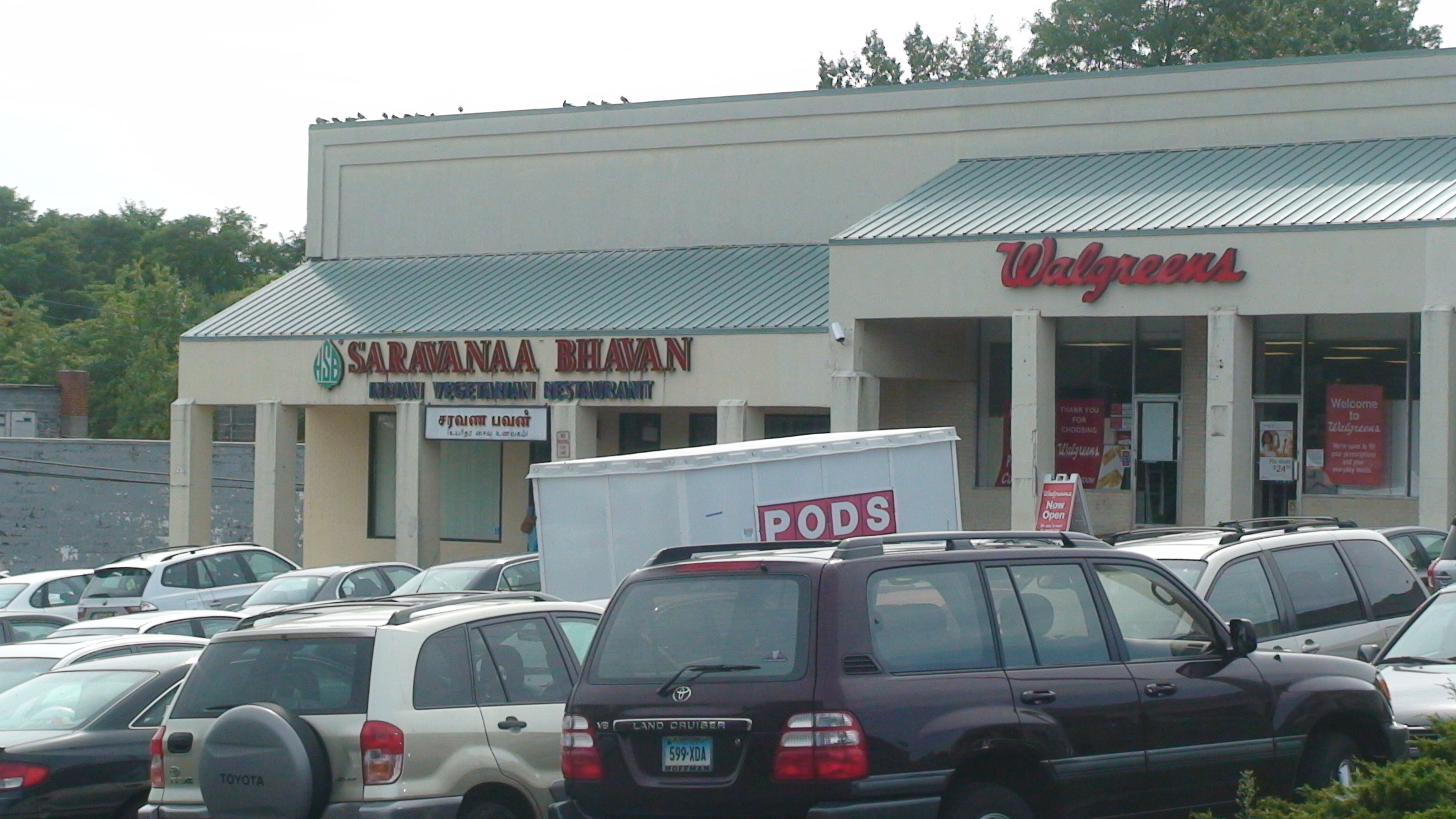
One of the most popular overseas branches of Chennai-based Saravanaa Bhavan, the world's largest Indian vegetarian restaurant chain, is located in Edison, New Jersey, U.S.

==== United States ====
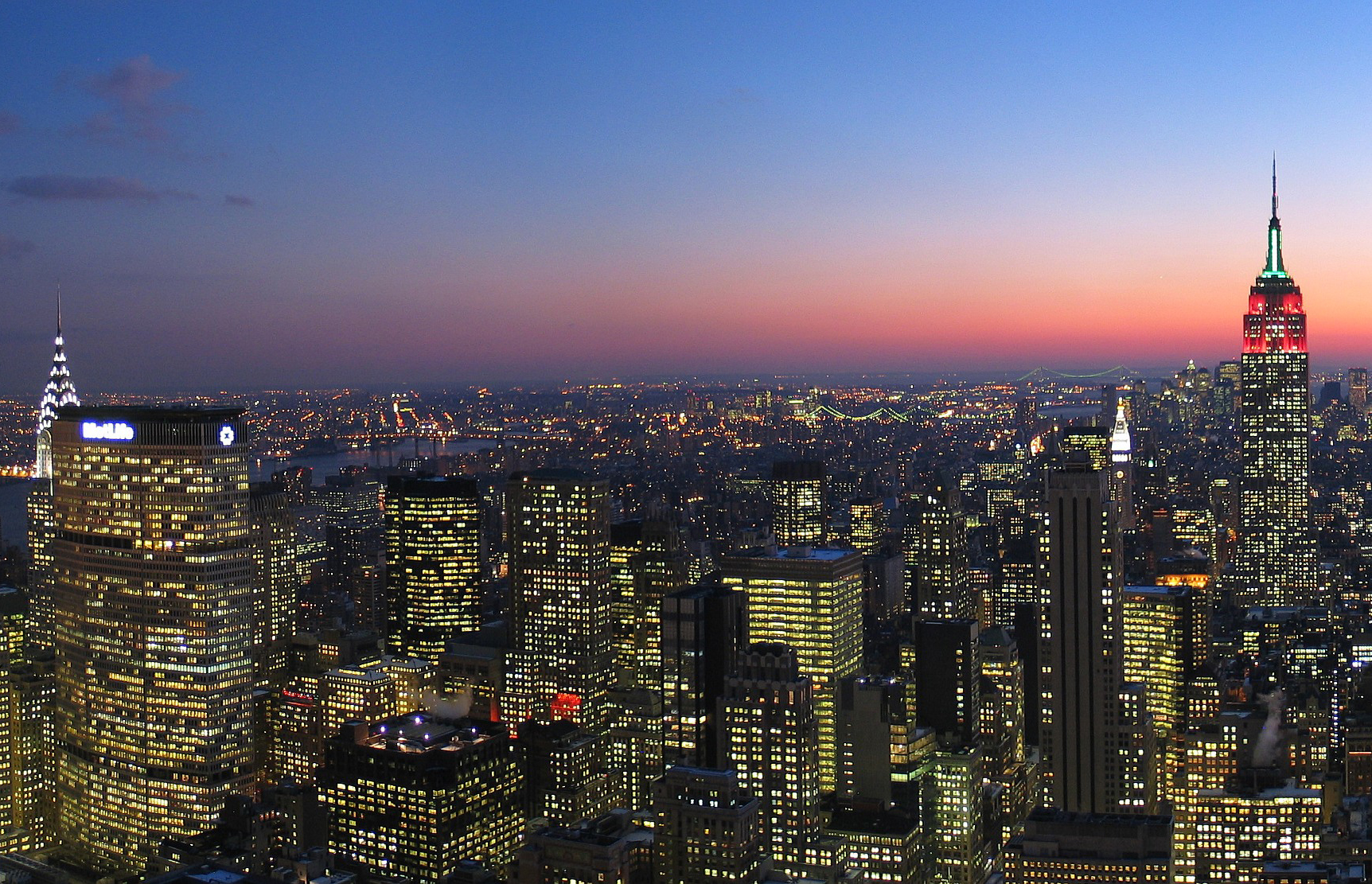
The New York City Metropolitan Area, including Central New Jersey, as well as Long Island and Staten Island in New York, is home to the largest Tamil American population.

Central New Jersey contains the largest population concentration of Indian Americans of Tamil descent. Sizeable populations of Indian American Tamils have also settled in New York City, and New Jersey and New York house separate Tamil Sangams. The Washington, D.C. metropolitan area on the East Coast as well as Silicon Valley on the West Coast also have Tamil associations. On the other hand, the New York City and Los Angeles metropolitan areas and Central New Jersey are home to the largest concentrations of Tamil-speaking Sri Lankan Americans.

According to the U.S. Census Bureau's 2012-2016 American Community Survey, there are 438,699 people speaking Tamil at home in the US.

==== French West Indies ====
Tamil migration to the French West Indies was mainly sailings from Pondicherry and Karaikal during the years 1853 to 1883 and since 1893 almost all of them got well integrated with the people there. There are about 36,000 ethnic Tamils in Guadeloupe and 15,000 in Martinique but the language has been lost there. Presently a microscopic minority of 17 who are in the age range 60-70 could speak the Tamil language.

==== Guyana ====
Guyana had many Tamils in its plantations since 1838. Most of them were from Madras and in 1860, 2500 from Madras alone settled there. Tamils were spread in about 60 towns. There is also a popular Mariamman temple. The former Prime Minister of Guyana, Moses Veerasammy Nagamootoo is of Tamil descent. Hindu Tamil Indians make up the majority of the East Berbice-Corentyne region in Guyana.

==== Trinidad and Tobago ====
Tamils have been in Trinidad and Tobago since the 1840s. The first Tamils arrived in Trinidad and Tobago as indentured laborers who were brought by the British to work on the sugarcane and other agricultural estates. There was a Shiva temple called the "Madras Sivalayam" or the Caura Road temple. The Deepavali celebration by the Tamils there displayed extraordinary pluralism.

=== Asia ===
==== South Asia ====
===== Pakistan =====
A large community of Tamils exists in Karachi, Pakistan, which includes approximately 1,000 Tamil-speaking Hindus as well as much larger numbers of Muslims - including some refugees from northern Sri Lanka. Tamil festivals such as Pongal, Panguni uthiram, and Thaipoosam are celebrated in Pakistan.

==== Southeast Asia ====
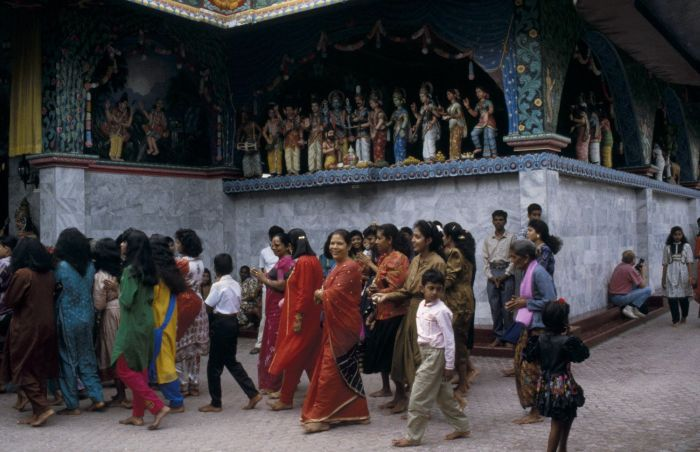
Tamil people in Medan, Indonesia

===== Burma =====
Burma had a Tamil population of 200,000 at one point in the country's history but since the end of the Second World War the number has fallen. The affluence of the Tamil community could be gauged by the existence of Dandayuthapani temples in 32 towns, the functioning of 50 Tamil primary schools, and the circulation of two Tamil newspapers, "Rasika Ranjani" and "Thondan", both of which were banned as of 1966.

===== Indonesia =====
Large numbers of Tamils were brought to Indonesia by the Dutch colonial government in the 1860s to build up their plantations. They were used as hard labor, many returned in the 1940s following their contract expiration. Although about 5,000 to 10,000 opted to remain in Northern Sumatra alone, creating a concentration of Tamil diaspora in the Island.

In contrast to the other parts of Indonesia, the majority of Indians in the island of Sumatra are Tamils, particularly in Medan.

===== Malaysia =====
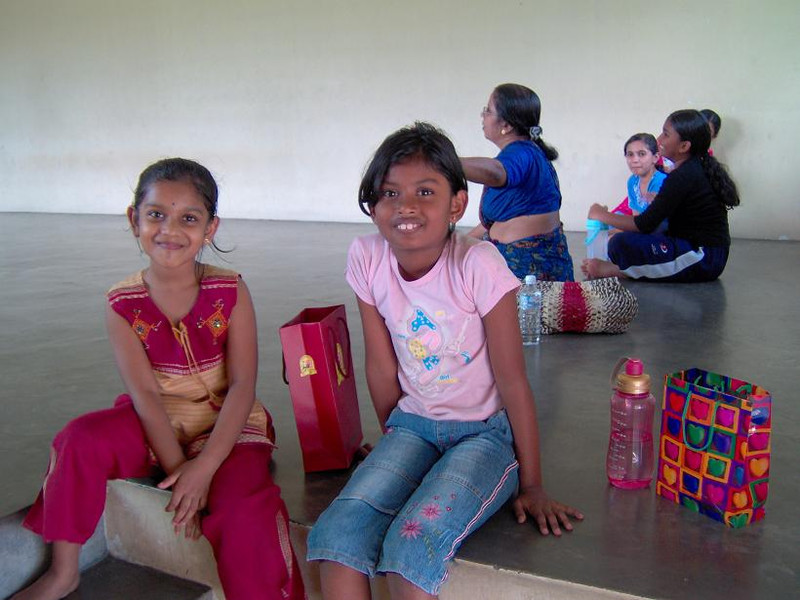
Tamil girls in Malaysia

Malaysia has a Tamil population of 1,800,000 making up 6.3% of the Malaysian population as of 2018 starting mainly from 1901 when it was called British Malaya. Initially the migration was to work in the rubber plantations but later turned to trade and other professions mostly in the government sector such as the railways and the Public Works Department. The first Tamil school was there as early as 1876 but by 1925 it rose to 235 and by 2018 they had 530 schools. Due to intense brain drain and citizenship problems, there is an estimated 250–300,000 Tamils which are yet to be recognized by the Government of Malaysia.

===== Singapore =====
According to the 2020 census, there were 198,449 Tamil citizens and permanent residents living in Singapore, representing 3.5% of the resident population. The number of Tamils among the 1.64 million "non-resident population"—foreigners working, studying or living in Singapore without permanent residence—was not provided.

Tamil is one of the four official languages in Singapore. An estimation of about 3.2% percent of the total population in Singapore speaks Tamil at home, while about 5% is literate in Tamil language. Almost all official documents printed in Singapore are translated and distributed in Tamil as well as three other national languages. In 1956, the Singapore government decided to adopt a trilingual policy. Students were taught English, a second language, as well as Malay as a third language. Today the emphasis has shifted to bilingualism, where the medium of instruction is English with the mother-tongue as a second language, while the third language is optional.

Tamil is taught as a second language in all government schools from the primary to junior college levels. Tamil is an examinable subject at all major nationwide exams. There is a daily Tamil newspaper printed in Singapore, the Tamil Murasu. There is a full-time radio station, Oli 96.8, and a full-fledged TV channel, Vasantham.

===== Philippines =====
Sepoy troops from Madras (now Chennai, Tamil Nadu), arrived in Manila, Philippines with the British expedition and occupation between 1762 and 1764 during the Seven Years' War. When the British withdrew, many of the Sepoys mutinied and refused to leave. Virtually all had taken Filipina brides (or soon did so). They settled in what is now Cainta, Rizal, just east of Metro Manila. The region in and around Cainta still has many Sepoy descendants.

===== Vietnam =====
Vietnam had a small minority of about 3,000 Tamils mostly in Saigon (nowadays Ho Chi Minh City). Dandayuthapani, Subramaniam Swamy and Mariyamman temples are located near Bến Thành Market. They were called Chitty, Chà Chetty, Xã tri, Xét ty but had left the country after the 1975 incident.

===== Thailand =====
Thailand has about 10,000 Tamils living there while there are 1,000 Tamils in Cambodia.

==== Middle East ====
The Middle East is home to thousands of migrants from Tamil Nadu and Sri Lanka, and over 75.000 migrants immigrated to the Middle East in 2012 alone. However, statistics on the numbers of migrants are scarce.

===== Qatar =====
Qatar is the home for about 200,000 Tamils mostly from Tamil Nadu. In December 2000, the "Qatar Tamil Sangam" was inaugurated for conducting Tamil cultural programmes, teaching of Thirukkural and for conducting Tamil elocution contests for Tamil children.

===== United Arab Emirates =====
According to the Tamil Nadu migration survey 2015, there are 400,000 emigrants in the United Arab Emirates having come from Tamil Nadu as professionals and workers in many sectors. This figure doesn't include other ethnic Tamil coming from other Indian states or other countries.

Pongal and New Year are celebrated on a grand scale in Dubai and in a few other states. The first Tamil newspaper from the Middle East region was launched from Dubai on 10 December 2014. Tamil 89.4 FM radio is a Tamil radio broadcasting from Dubai, UAE.

===== Saudi Arabia =====
According to the Tamil Nadu migration survey 2015, there are 350,000 emigrants having come to Saudi Arabia from Tamil Nadu as workers. This figure doesn't include other ethnic Tamil coming from other Indian states or other countries.

===== Other countries =====
Bahrain is home for over 7000 Tamils mostly professionals and workers. Kuwait is also home for a substantial number of Tamils who are recent migrants.

=== Europe ===
==== Scandinavia ====
The first Tamil immigrant to Norway, Anthony Rajendram from Gurunagar, came to Norway in 1956. The majority of the early immigrants had contacts to Rajendram, and came as immigrant worker. Most had their origins in a few villages on the edge of Jaffna town such as Gurunagar, Ariyalai and Navanthurai. This first group was a starting point for future immigration to Norway. Norway has about 10,000(2000) - 13,000(before 2010s)Tamils most of whom are Sri Lankan refugees. The city of Bergen is the home for about 400 Tamil families and it has become the centre for Tamil gatherings. Around 7,000 Tamils also live in the capital Oslo. Sweden has a Tamil population of about 2,000 and is of recent origin.

==== United Kingdom ====
Community estimates suggest that 150,000 Tamils lived in the United Kingdom (UK) as of 2008, with a 2006 Human Rights Watch report putting the number of Sri Lankan Tamils in the UK at 110,000. Migration of significant numbers of Tamils to the UK started with labor migrants in the 1940s. These were joined by students moving to the UK for education in the 1970s, and by refugees fleeing the Sri Lankan Civil War in the 1980s and 1990s.

==== Metropolitan France ====
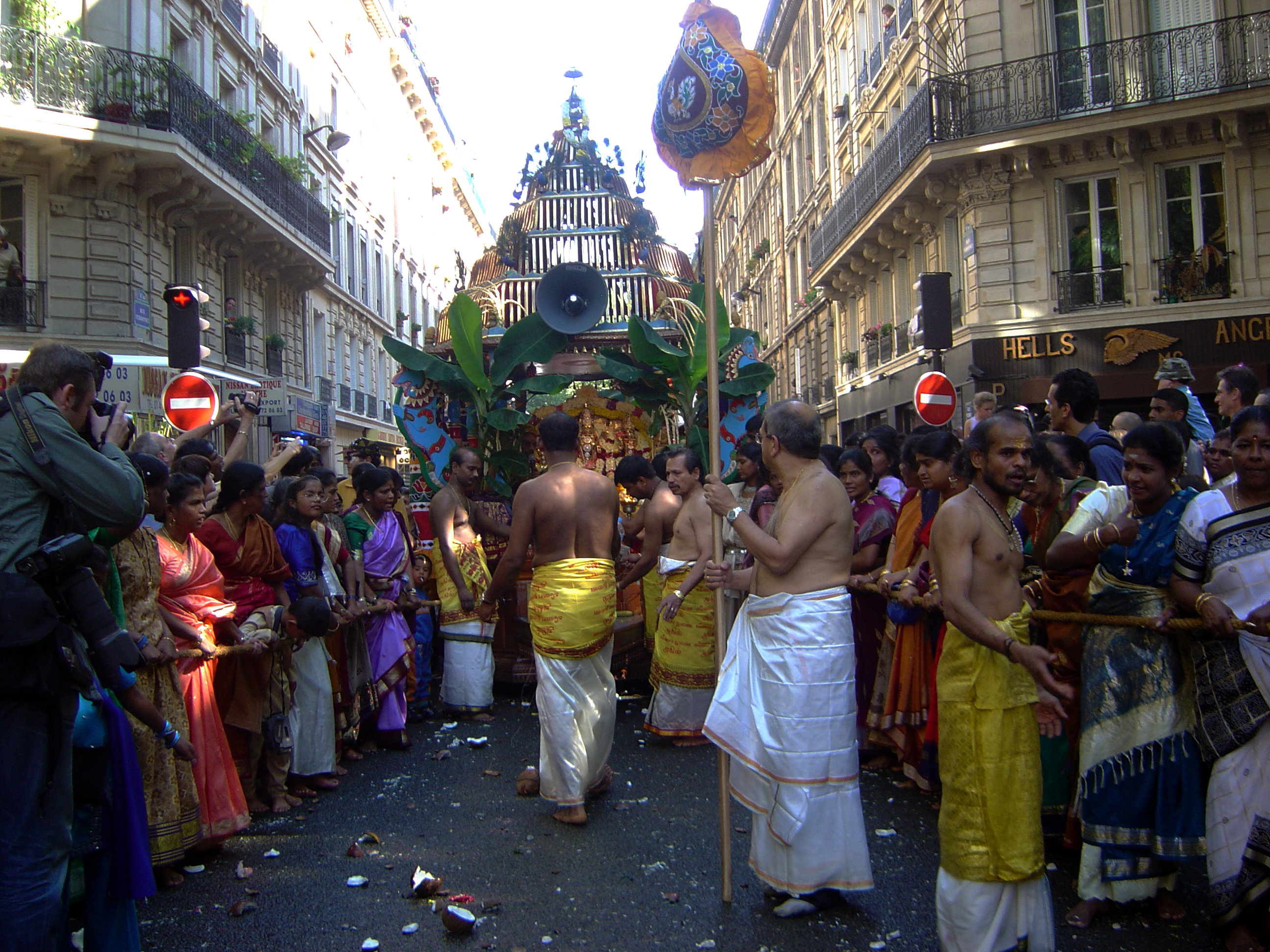
Celebrations of Murugan by the Sri Lankan Tamil community in Paris, France

About 302,000 Tamils live in France, including 125,000 in Metropolitan France. The first Tamils to arrive in France came from Pondichéry when it was still a French colony. However, a majority of Parisian Tamils are of Sri Lankan origin who fled the country and came to France as refugees in the 1980s, escaping the violent civil conflict.

==== Germany ====
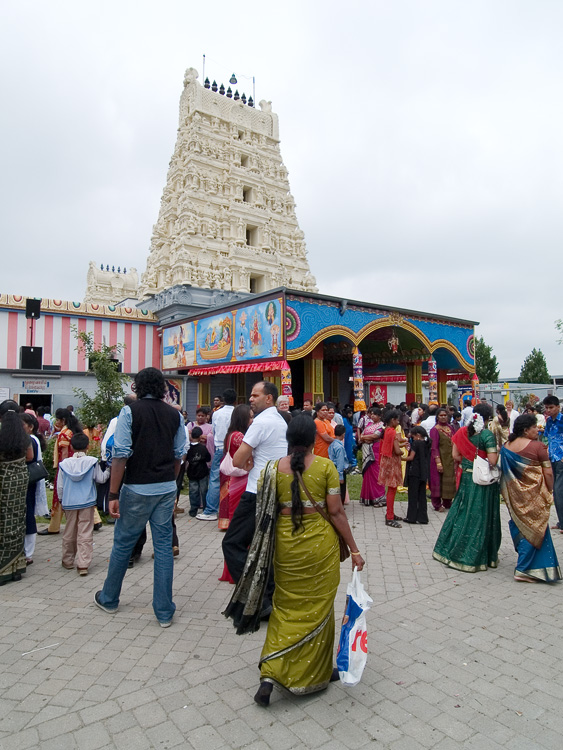
Sri Kamakshi Ambaal temple in Hamm, Germany

Germany has well over 50,000 Tamils and more than half of them went as refugees from Sri Lanka. Religious fervor among Tamil Germans intensified as their numbers swelled. Due to the inspirational encouragement of Hawaii Subramaniaswami – the disciple of Yoga Swamigal – two well organised Hindu temples – Sidhivinayagar Kovil and the kamadchi Amman Kovil –have in place in the city of Hamm since 1984. According to the journal Hinduism Today, the youth are being well trained in their religion and culture at home and in weekend schools in rented halls using texts from Sri Lanka. They even wear Hindu symbols of Vibuthi and Tilakam.

==== Switzerland ====
Switzerland has about 40,000 Tamils the majority of whom are from Sri Lanka who went as refugees, making the biggest non-European ethnic group. Although they are well entrenched in the country and integrated with the local community, yet they are actively alive to their Hindu or Christian religious and Tamil cultural links. Temples, cultural festivals, international conferences, seminars and meetings draw many of the Tamil diaspora from other European countries to the various Swiss cities, so much so that it has become the nerve centre of Tamil cultural activism. A large Tamil community was established in Zurich with a place known as little Jaffna.

==== Other countries ====
Denmark has over 7,000 Tamils, the majority being refugees. There are two well patronised Hindu temples – one for Vinayagar and another for Abhirami – and the Tamil population has got well adapted to the Danish environment. The Netherlands also has more than 20,000 Tamils, the majority of whom are, again, refugees from Sri Lanka.

=== Oceania ===
==== Australia ====
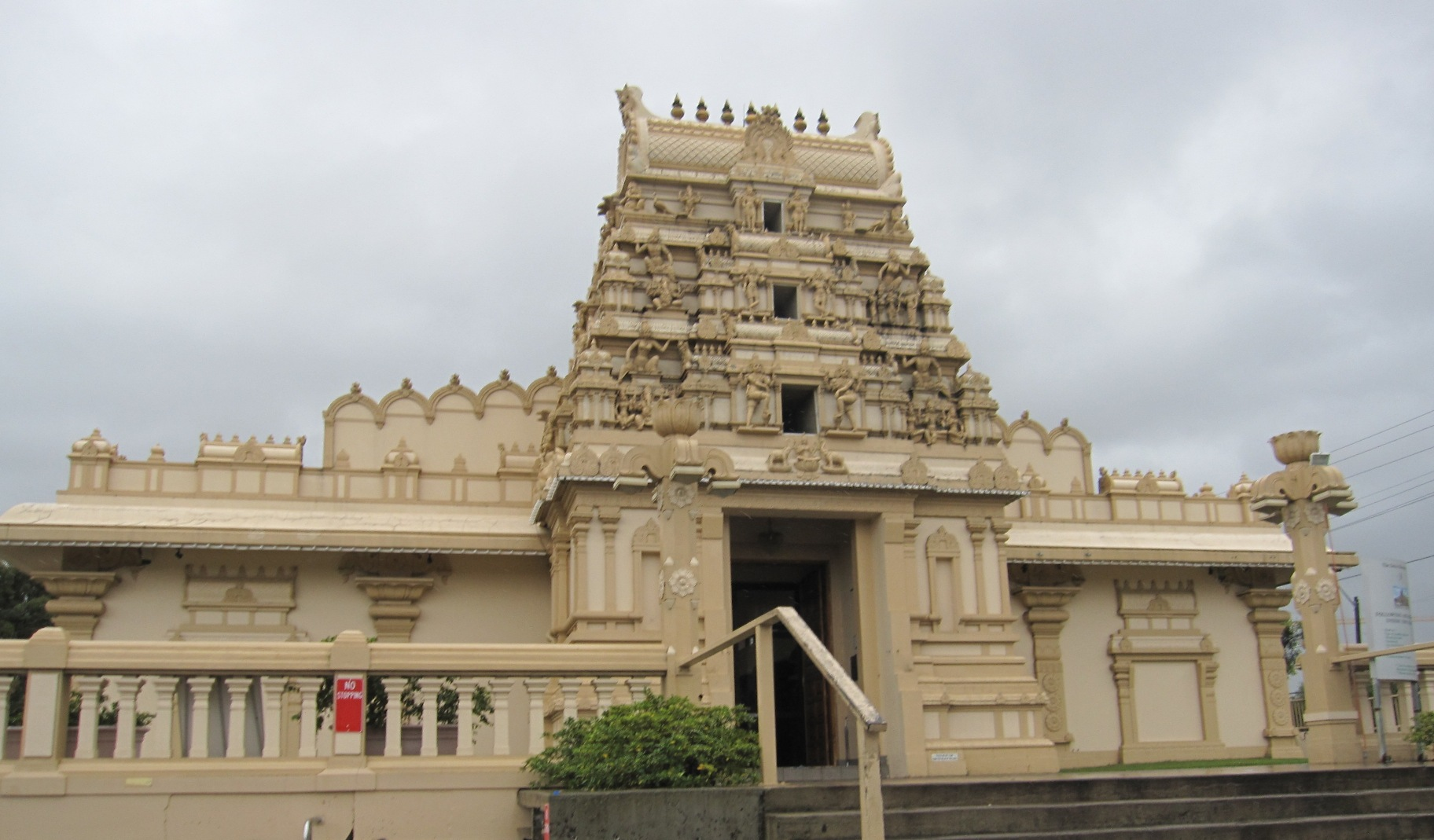
Murugan Temple, Sydney

There are officially about 72,000 Tamils in Australia spread out in all the six states but the concentration is mainly in the states of New South Wales and Victoria. However, the actual number of ethnic Tamils is possibly double this amount and could be estimated at 100,000. Among this 40% are from Sri Lanka and 35% are from India. The remainder come from various countries like Malaysia, Singapore, Canada, USA, South Africa, Fiji and Mauritius. More than 80% have completed high school education compared to 78% (2010) for the general Australian population. More than 15% own their houses while more than 30% of the general population own their houses.

Numerous Tamil schools and Hindu Temples have been established in all main cities to cater for the growing Sri Lankan Tamil population. The Sydney Murugan Temple was constructed for the needs of the large Tamil population in Western Sydney. Smaller temples have been built in the greater Sydney area. The Siva Vishnu Temple in Carrum Downs south east of Melbourne is also a temple built by Sri Lankan Tamils. The Sunshine Murugan Temple in western Melbourne also caters to the Tamil community. In other cities such as Adelaide, Brisbane, Perth, Townsville, Darwin, Canberra and Hobart, Hindu temples have also been built.

The Tamil language is one of the approved subjects for the HSC examination and Tamil skill tests are conducted for children of ages five to sixteen.

==== New Zealand ====
New Zealand has about 12,474 Tamils, mostly professionals who have migrated on their own.

==== Fiji ====
Fiji had a Tamil population of over 110,000 having been taken there to work in the plantations by the colonial masters in the 1880s. Out of an Indian population of 350,000 the Tamils could number about 80,000 now.

The number who could speak is about 5,000 only and another 1,000 could write. It is only about 6,000 who declare their origins as Tamils as most of them have got well integrated with the local population. Most of them have lost their Tamil identity and are Tamils only in name. The South Indian Sanmarga Sangam is the pioneer body that forged the Tamil culture, Tamil education and the Hindu practices in the country for a long time. In 2005, it was revealed that in the 20 primary schools managed by TISI, out of the 4940 students, 1765 took Tamil classes.

==== New Caledonia ====
There are about 500 New Caledonians of Indian Tamil descent. Like in Réunion, they were known as Malabars and originally arrived in the 19th century from other French Territories, namely Réunion. New Caledonia has several descendants of Tamils, whose parents intermarried with the local population in the last century.

== See also ==
- Tamil Nadu diaspora
- Indian Tamils of Sri Lanka
- Sri Lankan Tamils
- Tamil nationalism
- List of Tamil businesspeople
