= Ranjani Hebbar =

- Born: September 9th 1983; Udupi, India
- Died: 9 June 2013 (aged 31); Udupi, India
- Occupation: Carnatic classical vocalist
- Years active: 23
- Parents: V. Aravinda Hebbar (Botany Professor) (father); Vasanthalakshmi Hebbar (mother)
- Musical career
- Genres: indian classical; carnatic
- Instrument: vocal

Ranjani Hebbar Guruprasad (1981 - 9 June 2013) was an Indian Carnatic music vocalist. Now her two disciples, Vid. Archana and Vid. Samanvi are propagating the music following their path shown by their Guru.

== Early life ==
Ranjani Hebbar was born in Udupi to Aravind Hebbar, a Botany Professor and Vasanthalakshmi. She started learning music from her parents and Madhoor Balasubramaniam and become the first disciple of S. Sowmya and Srinivasan, Sowmya's father. She continued to study under Chengalpet Ranganathan and Completed her post graduation in Carnatic Music from Madras University. She married Guruprasad, a Software Engineer.

== Professional career ==
She was an A-Grade artist on All India Radio and has performed on many stages in South India, including on national television.

== Death ==
Ranjani Hebbar died of Cancer on June 9, 2013, in KMC Hospital, Manipal.

== Awards and titles ==
- Kalki Award
- Isai Chudar
- M S Subbulakshmi scholarship
