= Hiremagalur =

Hiremagalur Doddamagaluru
- locality
- Location in Karnataka, India Hiremagalur (India)
- Coordinates: 13°18′19″N 75°47′44″E
- Country: India
- State: Karnataka
- District: Chikkamagaluru

Languages
  - Official: Kannada
- Time zone: UTC+5:30 (IST)

Hiremagalur (IAST: hirēmagalūru, IPA: [hiremaɡaluːru] or 'town of the big'/'elder daughter'), was until recently a separate village, is now a locality in Chikkamagaluru (or town of the younger daughter) of Karnataka. In 1971, its population was 1,456 in an area of 1,300 hectares.

== History ==
Inscriptions mention that during 9th and 11th-centuries, Hiremagalur was a flourishing agrahara town. Legends suggest that in this area, nine siddhas performed penance near a pond in the village known as Siddha Pushkarni. Legend has it that Parashurama too lived here, giving the village the epithet Bhargavapuri, or "the town of Bhargava (Parashurama)."

Another legend suggests that this city was given as a gift to the elder daughter (elder daughter or hiriya magalu in Kannada) of King Rukmangada, who ruled Sakrepatna at the time. Hence the name of the locality came to be known as Hiremagalur (the town of the elder daughter).

== Location ==
The town is located about 3 km from the city of Chikmagalur. The new Chikmagalur railway station is being built in this place. A lot of new industries have started in this place.

== Religion and Culture ==
The village is well known for its Kodandarama Temple, which depicts Rama, his consort Sita, and brother Lakshmana, as they would have appeared according to a Hindu wedding procession, with Sita to the right of Rama. This is different from popular renderings of the trio, where Sita appears to Rama's left. In the Kodandarama Temple, rituals and prayer are recited in pure Kannada, which is contrary to the other temples where all the prayers are recited in Sanskrit rather than Kannada.
