= Hebbard =

Hebbard is an English language surname. People who share this surname include:

- Col Hebbard (born 1936), Australian rules footballer with Essendon
- James Hebbard (1862–1941), mine manager in Australia
- William S. Hebbard (1863–1930), American architect in San Diego County, California

== See also ==
- Hubbard (surname)
