= Panchagrama Brahmin =

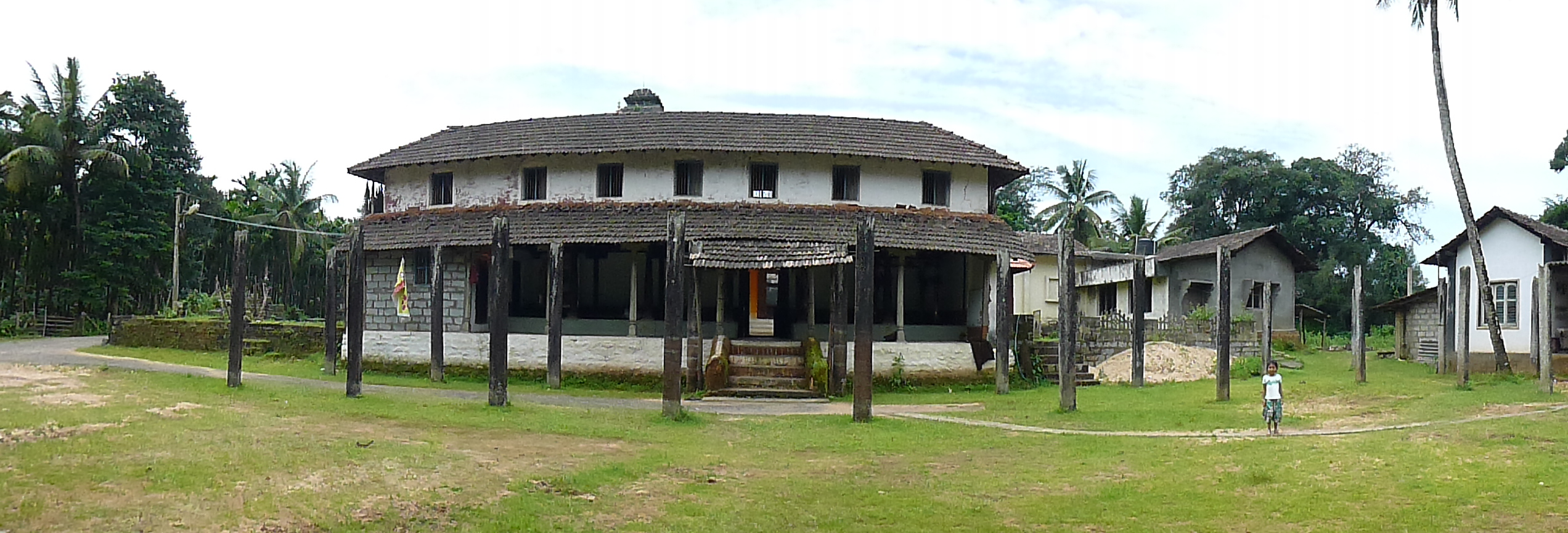

Regions with significant populations
- Udupi District, Karnataka; Shimoga district, Karnataka; Chikkamagaluru district, Karnataka

Languages
- Standard Kannada, Kundgannada, Sanskrit

Religion
- Hinduism: Classification Based on Sampradaya: Smartha: Classification based on Veda: Rigvedi

The Panchagrama Brahmins are a Brahmin community that follow the Smartha Sampradaya. They belong to the Indian state of Karnataka, and reside primarily in the districts of Udupi, Shimoga and Chikmaglur, Bengaluru and other cities.

== Etymology ==
The words Panchagrama Brahmin (पंचग्रामब्राह्मण) are from Sanskrit and the term translates as one Brahmin from five villages.

== Classification ==
The Panchagrama Brahmins belong to the group of Pancha Dravida Brahmins in Karnataka. Though the Panchagramis primarily speak Kannada, they are classified as one of the six subdivisions of Tulu Brahmins, along with other Kannada and Tulu speaking Brahmins of South Canara. This is because Tulu is predominant in the erstwhile South Canara district (of which the present Udupi district was a part). Majority of the community stays in Shimoga and Chikamagalur district.

== Language ==
The Panchagrama Brahmins speak Kannada as their first language. The standard dialect is spoken by those in Shimoga and Chikmanglur, whereas in the Kundapura taluka of Udupi district, Kundagannada is in parlance. Additionally, Sanskrit is used for religious rituals.

== Family deity ==
The Shankaranarayana Temple at Shankaranarayana, whose deity is a confluence of both Shankara (Shiva) and Narayana ( Vishnu), houses the family deity of the Panchagramis. The Udbhava Linga, a naturally formed lingam of Lord Shankara and Lord Narayana, is the main deity of this temple. The lingam is a foot below ground, inside the Garbhagudi and only its mirror image can be seen by the devotees. A legend ascribes the founding of the holy place to Maharishi Parashurama as one of seven others. The village is located in a valley near the Sahyadris in Udupi district, at a distance of 25 km from the coast. Shankaranarayana, Subrahmanya, Udupi, Kumbhakaashi, Koteshwara, Kolluru and Gokarna are the seven holy places which constitute the Parashurama Kshetra. At the same time majority of this community who are in Shimoga and Chikamagalur district also worship Lord Venkateshwara of Tirumala as family deity.

== Mutt ==
The Panchagrama Brahmins identify with the Tirthamukthapuri Shri Matha, Tirthamuttur, located in the Thirthahalli taluk of Shimoga district. This Matha came into existence during the period of the Vijayanagara Empire. It is located on the banks of the Tunga river, along with an ancient Yoga Narasimha Swamy temple.

== See also ==
- Shankaranarayana
- Sringeri Sharada Peetham
