= Hebbar Iyengar =

Indian caste

- Guru: Ramanuja
- Religions: Hinduism
- Languages: Kannada, Hebbar Tamil, Telugu, Sanskrit,
- Country: India
- Original state: Karnataka
- Populated states: Karnataka
- Related groups: Iyengars

Hebbar Iyengar or Hebbari Srivaishnava is a caste of Hindu Brahmins of Tamil and Kannada origin whose members follow the Visishtadvaita philosophy propounded by Ramanuja. They are found primarily in the Indian state of Karnataka especially in the southern districts. They speak Hebbar Tamil, a minority dialect of Tamil, reflecting extensive contact with Kannada.

== Notable Hebbar Iyengars ==
- Bellur Krishnamachar Sundararaja Iyengar - Yogacharya credited with popularizing yoga in the west
- B.S. Kesavan - First national librarian of India
- B.S. Ranga - Film director and producer
- Raja Ramanna - Nuclear physicist and director of India's nuclear program
- H.K. Kesavan - Systems theorist and computer scientist at the University of Waterloo., and first chair of Electrical Engineering at IIT, Kanpur
- Jairam Ramesh - Indian politician from the Indian National Congress
- Sargur Srihari - Computer scientist at the University at Buffalo, credited with developing the first handwritten address interpretation system
- Vasundhara Das - actress and playback singer
- HVR Iengar - first Reserve Bank of India Governor

== See also ==
- Visishtadvaita
