= Kaula (month) =

Twelfth month of the Newa calendar

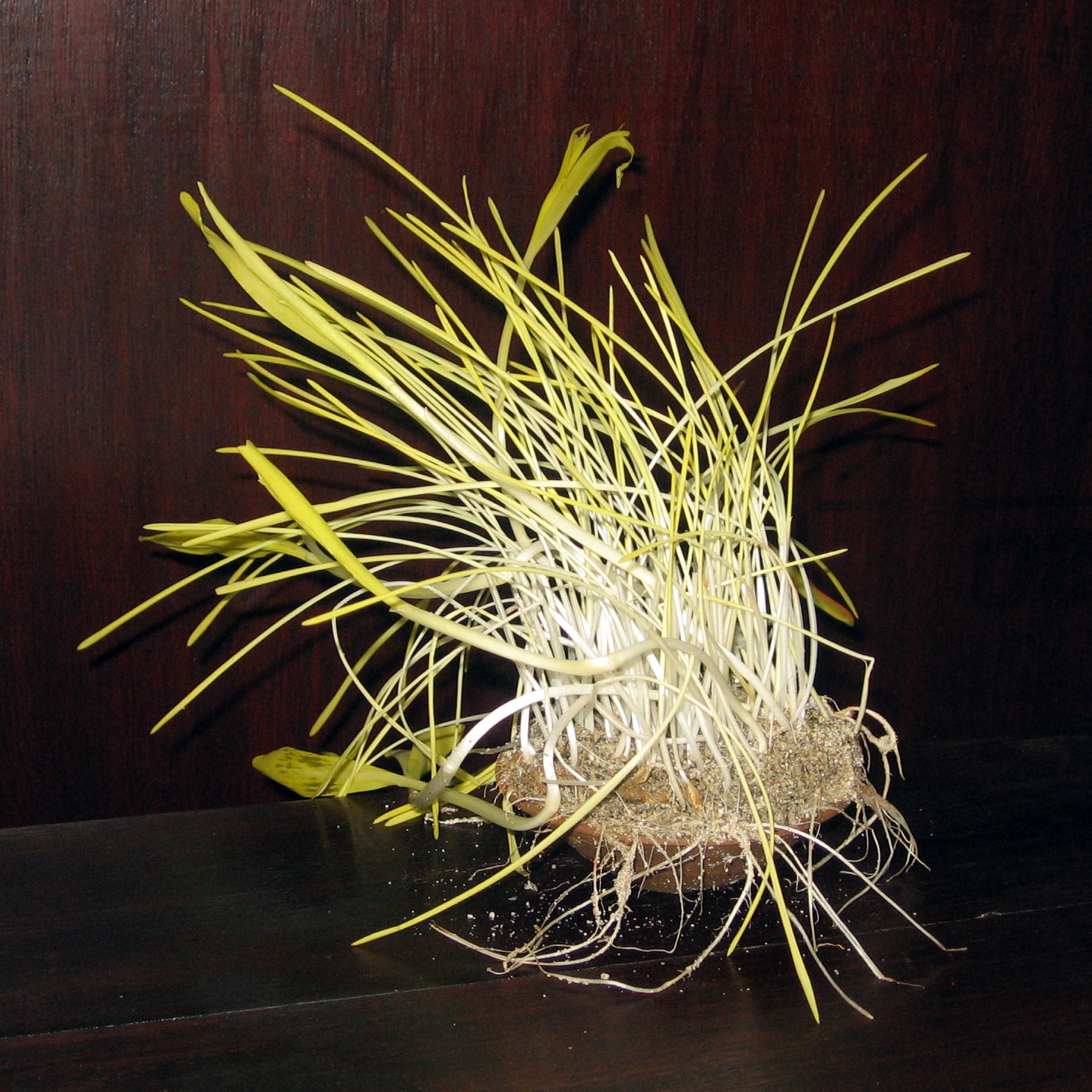
Barley shoots are a symbol of the Dasain festival that occurs during the month of Kaulā.

Kaulā (Nepal Bhasa: कौला) is the twelfth month in the Nepal Era calendar, the national lunar calendar of Nepal. The month coincides with Ashvin (अश्विन्) in the Hindu lunar calendar and overlaps with October and November in the Gregorian calendar.

Kaulā begins with the new moon and the full moon falls on the 15th of the lunar month. The month is divided into the bright and dark fortnights which are known as Kaulā Thwa (कौला थ्व) and Kaulā Gā (कौला गा) respectively.

Kaulā is a festive month. On the third day of the bright fortnight, masked dances of the Goddess Rudrayani are performed in Khokna, a village to the south of Kathmandu.

The greatest event of the month is Dasain, known as Mohani in Nepal Mandala. It is the longest religious celebration in the country, starting from the 1st day of the bright fortnight and continuing till the full moon day. However, the main celebrations last for four days from the 8th to the 11th days. The festivities consist of religious services in the clan's shrine house, family feasts, sword processions and masked dances of deities.

The 13th day of the dark fortnight is the start of another great festival Tihar or Swanti. The first two days are dedicated to crows and dogs respectively. The 15th day is Lakshmi Puja when households worship the goddess of wealth in their private shrines. The day is also the last day of the lunar Nepal Era, and traditionally merchants closed their accounting books.

== Days in the month ==
Thwa (थ्व) or Shukla Paksha (bright half)	Gā (गा) or Krishna Paksha (dark half)
1. Pāru	1. Pāru
2. Dwitiyā	2. Dwitiyā
3. Tritiyā	3. Tritiyā
4. Chauthi	4. Chauthi
5. Panchami	5. Panchami
6. Khasti	6. Khasti
7. Saptami	7. Saptami
8. Ashtami	8. Ashtami
9. Navami	9. Navami
10. Dashami	10. Dashami
11. Ekādashi	11. Ekādashi
12. Dwādashi	12. Dwādashi
13. Trayodashi	13. Trayodashi
14. Chaturdashi	14. Charhe (चह्रे)
15. Punhi (पुन्हि)	15. Āmāi (आमाइ)

== Months of the year ==
Devanagari script	Roman script	Corresponding Gregorian month	Name of Full Moon
1. कछला	Kachhalā	November	Saki Milā Punhi, Kārtik Purnimā
2. थिंला	Thinlā	December	Yomari Punhi, Dhānya Purnimā
3. पोहेला	Pohelā	January	Milā Punhi, Paush Purnimā
4. सिल्ला	Sillā	February	Si Punhi, Māghi Purnimā
5. चिल्ला	Chillā	March	Holi Punhi, Phāgu Purnimā
6. चौला	Chaulā	April	Lhuti Punhi, Bālāju Purnimā
7. बछला	Bachhalā	May	Swānyā Punhi, Baisākh Purnimā
8. तछला	Tachhalā	June	Jyā Punhi, Gaidu Purnimā
9. दिल्ला	Dillā	July	Dillā Punhi, Guru Purnimā
10. गुंला	Gunlā	August	Gun Punhi, Janāi Purnimā (Raksha Bandhan)
11. ञला	Yanlā	September	Yenyā Punhi, Bhādra Purnimā
12. कौला	Kaulā	October	Katin Punhi, Kojāgrat Purnimā
