= Tachhala (month) =

Eighth month of the Newa calendar

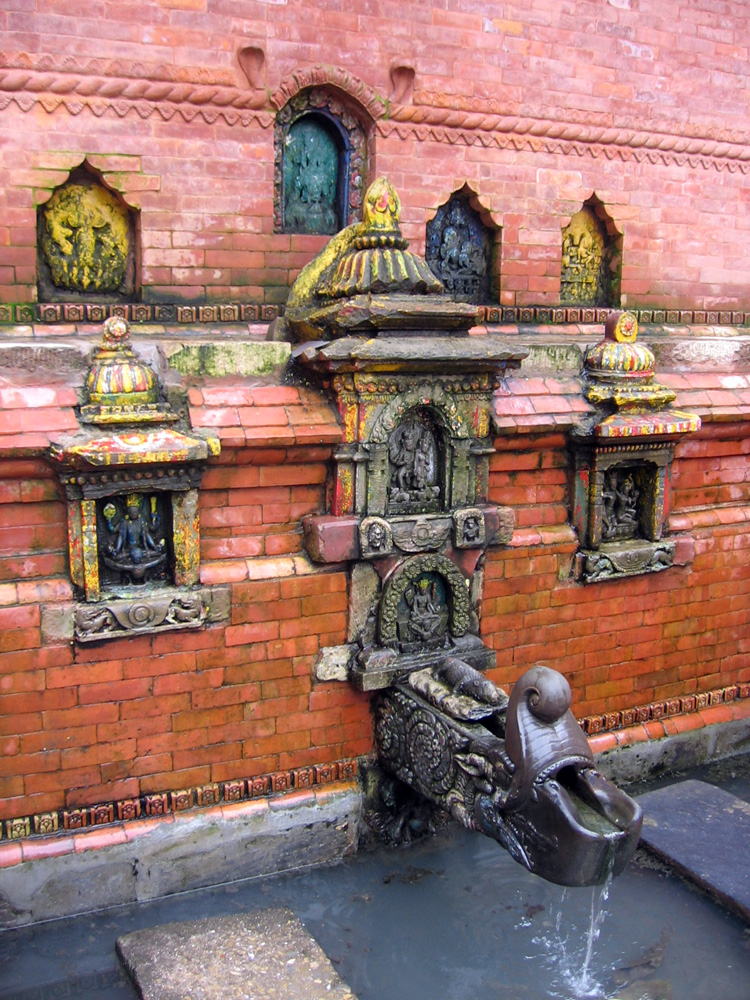
Water sources are cleaned during Sithi Nakha festival.

Tachhalā (Nepal Bhasa: तछला) is the eighth month in the Nepal Era calendar, the national lunar calendar of Nepal. The month coincides with Jyeshtha (ज्येष्ठ) in the Hindu lunar calendar and June in the Gregorian calendar.

Tachhalā begins with the new moon and the full moon falls on the 15th of the lunar month. The month is divided into the bright and dark fortnights which are known as Tachhalā Thwa (तछला थ्व) and Tachhalā Gā (तछला गा) respectively.

Among the major festivals observed during the month, the 6th day of the bright fortnight is Sithi Nakha which is dedicated to Kumar Kartikeya, one of the two sons of Hindu deity Shiva. The special food of the festival is "wo", a lentil cake. The holiday also has an environmental aspect, as water sources like wells, ponds and fountains are cleaned on this day.

The full moon day of Gaidu Purnimā, known as Jyā Punhi in Nepal Bhasa, is a widely celebrated holiday. For Buddhists, Jya Punhi is sacred as the day when Prince Siddhartha, the Buddha-to-be, left his home in search of enlightenment.

The full moon day is also known as Panauti Punhi for the festival that takes place in Panauti, a town to the east of Kathmandu. During Panauti Jātrā, chariot processions of the deities Bhairava and Bhadrakali are held in the most important celebration here.

On the 8th day of the dark fortnight, the festival of Machā Tiyā Jātrā or Trishul Jātrā ("The Procession with the Trident") is held in Deopatan in Kathmandu.

== Days in the month ==
Thwa (थ्व) or Shukla Paksha (bright half)	Gā (गा) or Krishna Paksha (dark half)
1. Pāru	1. Pāru
2. Dwitiyā	2. Dwitiyā
3. Tritiyā	3. Tritiyā
4. Chauthi	4. Chauthi
5. Panchami	5. Panchami
6. Khasti	6. Khasti
7. Saptami	7. Saptami
8. Ashtami	8. Ashtami
9. Navami	9. Navami
10. Dashami	10. Dashami
11. Ekādashi	11. Ekādashi
12. Dwādashi	12. Dwādashi
13. Trayodashi	13. Trayodashi
14. Chaturdashi	14. Charhe (चह्रे)
15. Punhi (पुन्हि)	15. Āmāi (आमाइ)

== Months of the year ==
Devanagari script	Roman script	Corresponding Gregorian month	Name of Full Moon
1. कछला	Kachhalā	November	Saki Milā Punhi, Kārtik Purnimā
2. थिंला	Thinlā	December	Yomari Punhi, Dhānya Purnimā
3. पोहेला	Pohelā	January	Milā Punhi, Paush Purnimā
4. सिल्ला	Sillā	February	Si Punhi, Māghi Purnimā
5. चिल्ला	Chillā	March	Holi Punhi, Phāgu Purnimā
6. चौला	Chaulā	April	Lhuti Punhi, Bālāju Purnimā
7. बछला	Bachhalā	May	Swānyā Punhi, Baisākh Purnimā
8. तछला	Tachhalā	June	Jyā Punhi, Gaidu Purnimā
9. दिल्ला	Dillā	July	Dillā Punhi, Guru Purnimā
10. गुंला	Gunlā	August	Gun Punhi, Janāi Purnimā (Raksha Bandhan)
11. ञला	Yanlā	September	Yenyā Punhi, Bhādra Purnimā
12. कौला	Kaulā	October	Katin Punhi, Kojāgrat Purnimā
