= Chila (month) =

Fifth month of the Newa calendar

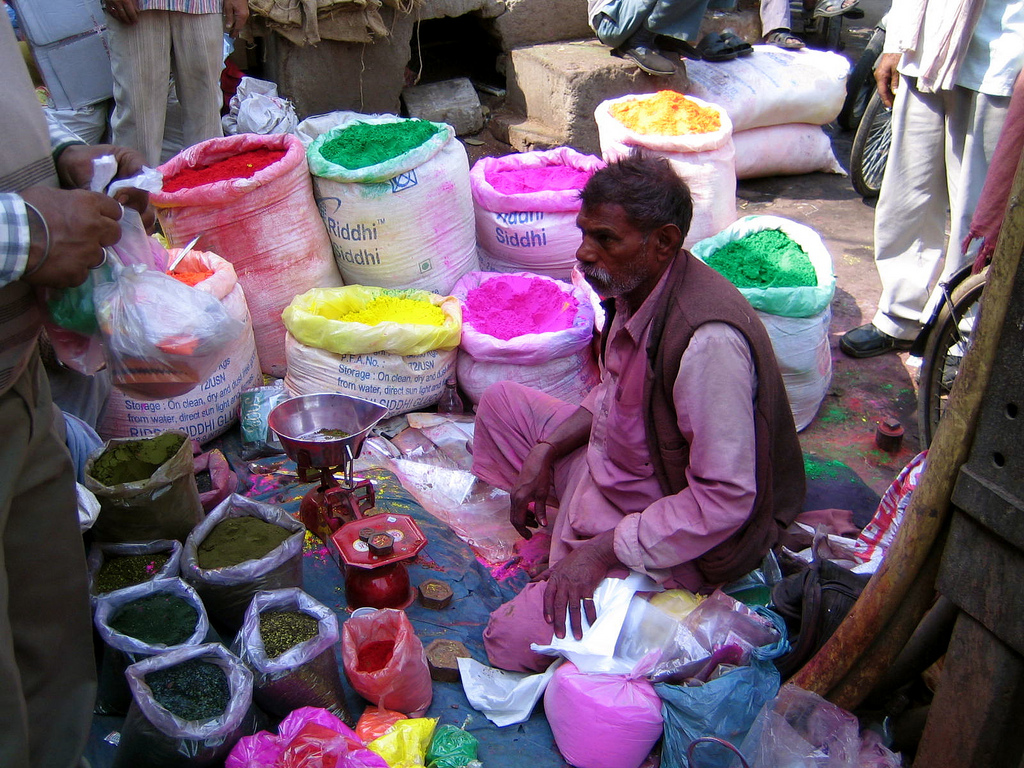
Pavement vendor selling colored powders for Holi

Chilā (Nepal Bhasa: 𑐔𑐶𑐮𑐵, चिला) is the fifth month in the Nepal Era calendar, the national lunar calendar of Nepal. The month coincides with Phalguna (फागुन) in the Hindu lunar calendar and roughly aligns with March in the Gregorian calendar.

Chilā begins with the new moon and the full moon falls on the 15th of the lunar month. The month is divided into the bright and dark fortnights which are known as Chilā Thwa (चिला थ्व) and Chilā Gā (चिला गा) respectively.

The major event that occurs during this month is Holi, the festival of colors, which begins on the 8th day of the bright fortnight and climaxes on the full moon day. The Chir, a pole surmounted by an umbrella-like structure decorated with strips of colorful cloth, is erected at Kathmandu Durbar Square to announce the festival.

The sacred bathing ceremony of the deity Nālā Karunāmaya, the Bodhisattva of Compassion, is held on the 1st day of the dark fortnight at Nālā. The chariot procession of Nālā Karunamaya is held on the 3rd day.

The festival of Pahan Charhe, one of the most important religious celebrations in Kathmandu, starts on the 14th day of the dark fortnight. Ghode Jātrā, the horse racing festival, is held the next day at the open ground of Tundikhel.

== Days in the month ==
| Thwa (थ्व) or Shukla Paksha (bright half) | Gā (गा) or Krishna Paksha (dark half) |
|---|---|
| 1. Pāru | 1. Pāru |
| 2. Dwitiyā | 2. Dwitiyā |
| 3. Tritiyā | 3. Tritiyā |
| 4. Chauthi | 4. Chauthi |
| 5. Panchami | 5. Panchami |
| 6. Khasti | 6. Khasti |
| 7. Saptami | 7. Saptami |
| 8. Ashtami | 8. Ashtami |
| 9. Navami | 9. Navami |
| 10. Dashami | 10. Dashami |
| 11. Ekādashi | 11. Ekādashi |
| 12. Dwādashi | 12. Dwādashi |
| 13. Trayodashi | 13. Trayodashi |
| 14. Chaturdashi | 14. Charhe (चह्रे) |
| 15. Punhi (पुन्हि) | 15. Āmāi (आमाइ) |

== Months of the year ==
| Devanagari script | Roman script | Corresponding Gregorian month | Name of Full Moon |
|---|---|---|---|
| 1. कछला | Kachhalā | November | Saki Milā Punhi, Kārtik Purnimā |
| 2. थिंला | Thinlā | December | Yomari Punhi, Dhānya Purnimā |
| 3. पोहेला | Pohelā | January | Milā Punhi, Paush Purnimā |
| 4. सिल्ला | Sillā | February | Si Punhi, Māghi Purnimā |
| 5. चिल्ला | Chilā | March | Holi Punhi, Phāgu Purnimā |
| 6. चौला | Chaulā | April | Lhuti Punhi, Bālāju Purnimā |
| 7. बछला | Bachhalā | May | Swānyā Punhi, Baisākh Purnimā |
| 8. तछला | Tachhalā | June | Jyā Punhi, Gaidu Purnimā |
| 9. दिल्ला | Dillā | July | Dillā Punhi, Guru Purnimā |
| 10. गुंला | Gunlā | August | Gun Punhi, Janāi Purnimā (Raksha Bandhan) |
| 11. ञला | Yanlā | September | Yenyā Punhi, Bhādra Purnimā |
| 12. कौला | Kaulā | October | Katin Punhi, Kojāgrat Purnimā |
