= Gunla =

Sacred month of Newar Buddhists in Nepal

Gunlā
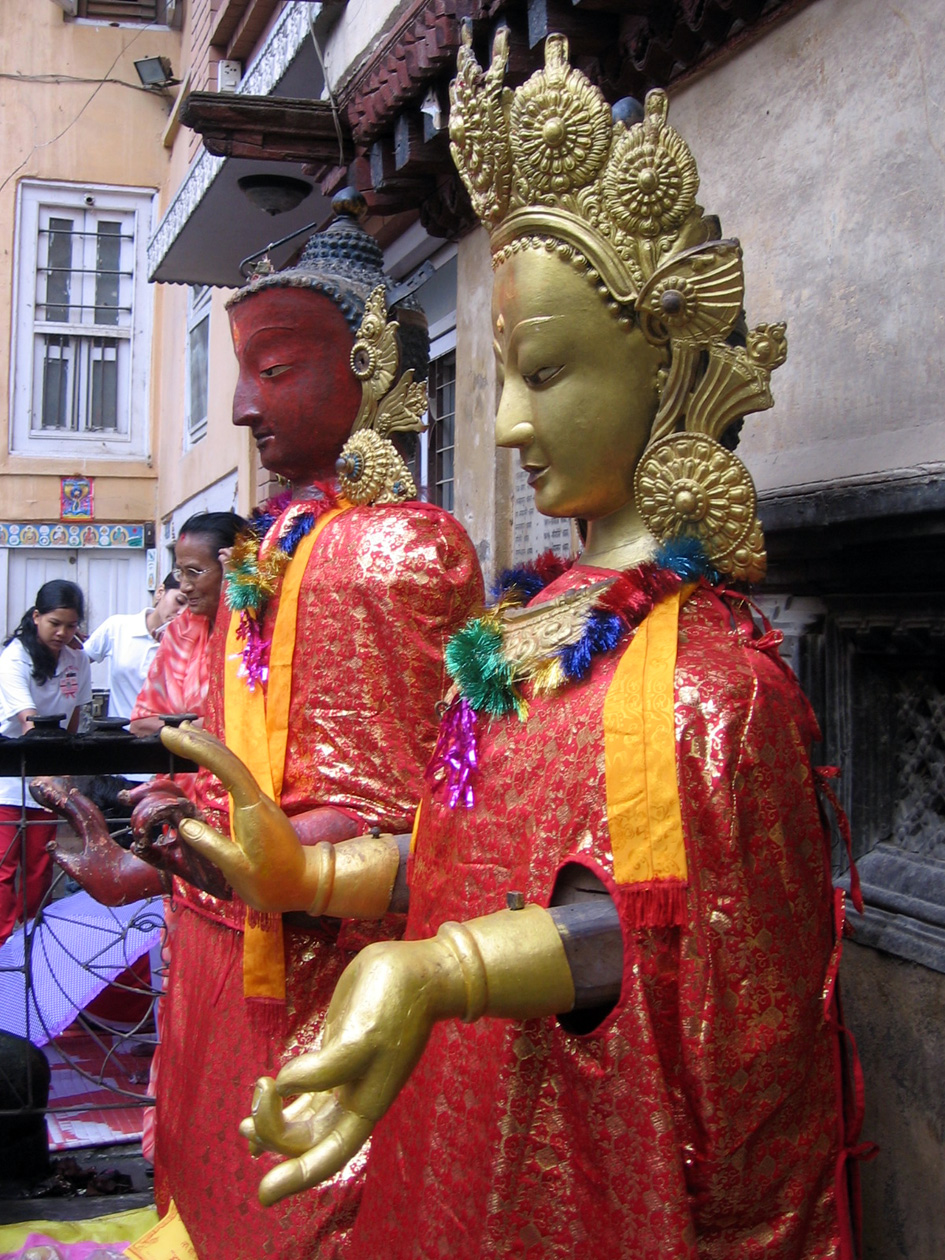
- Statues of Dipankara Buddha on display during Gunlā in Kathmandu
- Also called: Gunlā Parva in Nepali
- Observed by: Nepalese Buddhists
- Type: Religious
- Significance: Celebrates rains retreat started by the Buddha
- Observances: Image displays, musical processions, alms distribution, fasting, prayer

Gunlā (Nepal Bhasa: गुँला) (also spelt Gumlā) is the tenth month in the Nepal Sambat lunar calendar, the national lunar calendar of Nepal. It corresponds to August in the Gregorian calendar.

Gunla is a holy month for Newar Buddhists when they recite the scriptures, observe fasts and visit places of worship playing devotional music. It is one of the most important events in Newar Buddhism. The practice of observing the sacred month is descended from the rains retreat dating from the Buddha's time when monks would stay in one place and teach the Dhamma to the locals during this period.

According to traditional beliefs, during primitive times, too much rain would fall. Due to this rain, the mud houses during the time would get devastated, moreover floods and landslides would add melancholy in people's lives. So, in order to downturn the melancholy, and be safe from floods and landslides, people would go to Swayambhu playing the devotional music as it was in an elevation.

== Observances ==
Devotees mark the holy month by making daily early morning pilgrimages to Swayambhu in Kathmandu and other Buddhist temples playing Gunla Bajan music. The musical bands represent various localities of the city.

The devout recite the scriptures at home and sacred courtyards. Some undergo fasting. Another devotional activity during Gunla is Dyah Thāyegu (द्यः थायेगु) when devotees make little stupas out of black clay using a mold.

== Major days ==
=== Panjarān ===
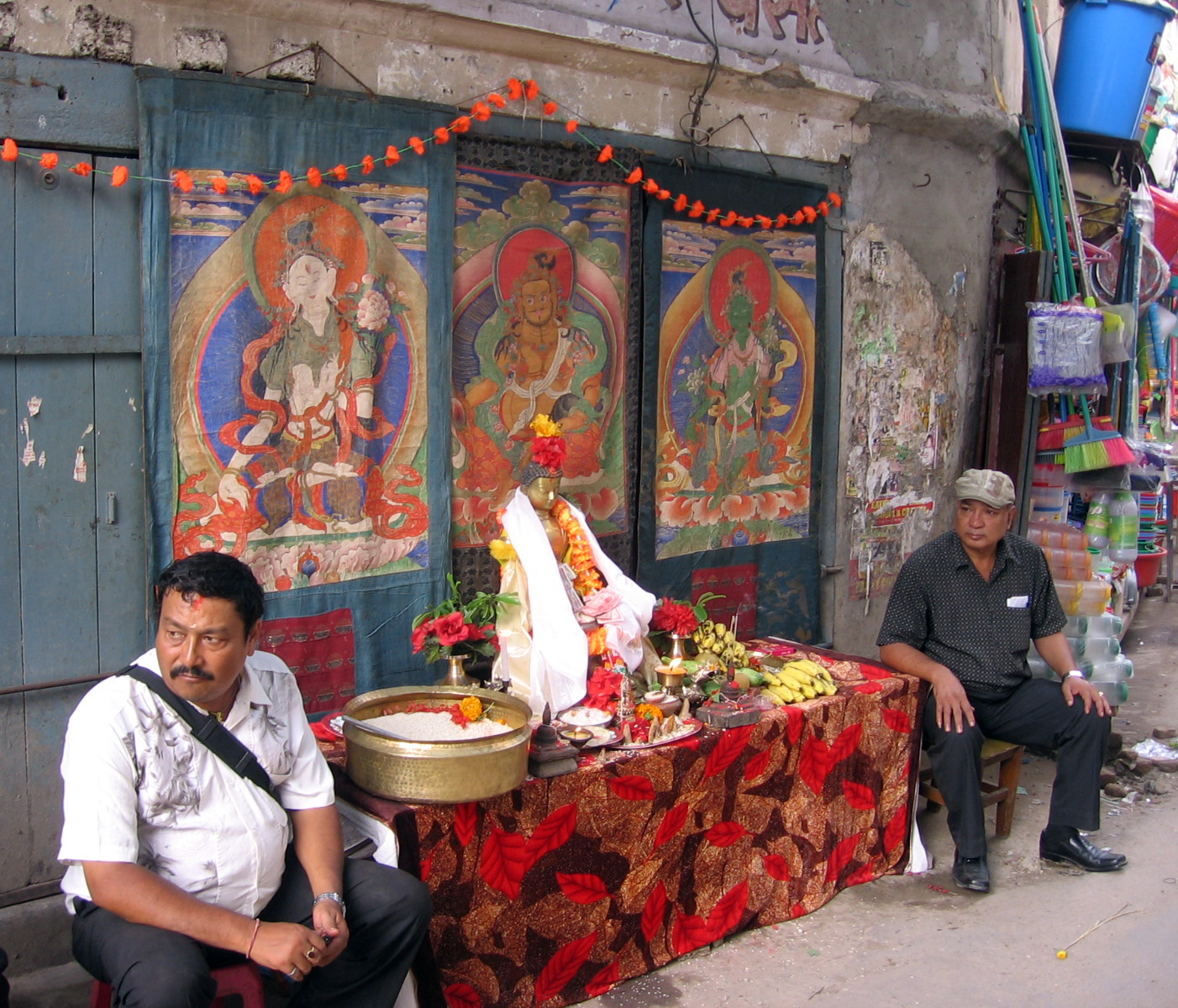
Devotees with offerings wait for alms receivers during Panjarān

Panjaran (पन्जरां) is the alms giving festival. Males of the Bajracharya and Shakya castes make an alms round of the city and devotees give them rice and money. Shrines are set up with Buddha statues and paubha scroll paintings at private homes, courtyards and on the roadsides from where the gifts are distributed. The event is held on different dates in Kathmandu valley and Lalitpur.

=== Buddha display ===
On the first day of the second fortnight of Gunla, large images of the Dipankara Buddha and paubha paintings are put on display in sacred courtyards. The ceremony is known as Bahidyah Bwayegu (बहीद्यः ब्वयेगु).

On this day in a festival known as Bahidyah Swahwanegu (बहीद्यः स्वःवनेगु), the musical bands followed by residents of the locality visit the sacred courtyards in a procession to view the exhibits. The festival occurs on the day after the full moon and coincides with the Gai Jatra festival.

Another major day for Gunla Bajan societies is the ceremony of Nisala Chhawanegu (निसला छाःवनेगु) when they make offerings to Swayambhu, and hold Gunla Bajan concerts at one's neighborhoods.

=== Bwo-gi ===
Also on the first day of Gunla in Lalitpur, the sacred early morning rally "Bwo-gi" begins usually from 1:30 in the morning and walked around the Buddhist templese and stupas until the sunrise. Generally it is believed to be stopped or paused for that day before the sunrise so that devotees wont step even the shadow of stupa (chaitya) or Buddha image. Like wise it takes normally four days to complete but take a day more if needed. The four stupas surrounding Lalitpur namely Lagankhya Thur in Lagankhel, Pucha Thur in Pulchowk, Bagmati Thur in Banglamukhi and Teta Thur in Gwarko are visited turn by turn in four days. The rally is accompanied by four types of musical bands namely Dha, Khin, Damokhin and Dhime Baja in a row. Each stupa is visited in a day thereby going to sub-stupas and temples visiting many Mahabihars and Bahals (chwoks or sacred courtyards). Devotees offer different types of offerings including chocolates, coins, camphor, etc. while going around the walk. About 400 - 500 participants participate in this holy walk out of which some are the family and relatives of recent descendants.

This year (2024 | 2081)'s Organizing Committee/Tole: Chhyetra No. 1 Nakabahil

=== Matayā ===
Matayā (मतया:) (meaning "light procession" in Nepal Bhasa) is one of the most important religious celebrations in Lalitpur visiting all the stupas visited in Baghi all in a day. The festival celebrates the event when the Buddha overcame Mara, or temptation, and attained the light of wisdom.

Devotees visit Buddhist shrines and sacred courtyards in the city in a winding file and offer worship to the images. The participants also consist of musical bands and actors dressed in colorful costumes. The circuitous festival route takes the whole day to complete.

This year (2024 | 2081)'s Organizing Committee/Tole: Chhyetra No. 1 Nakabahil

== Other celebrations ==
The 5th day of the bright fortnight is Nag Panchami, a day dedicated to serpents. The 1st day of the dark fortnight is Sāpāru or Gai Jātrā when processions are held in memory of family members deceased in the past year. The participants wear cow costumes and make a tour of the city.

The 8th day of the dark fortnight is the festival of Krishna Janmashtami which celebrates the birth of the Hindu deity Krishna. Gokarna Aunsi falls on the 15th day of the dark fortnight or Āmāi. This is Father's Day and is also known as Bauyā Khwā Swayegu ("Looking upon Father's Face").

== Days in the month ==
Thwa (थ्व) or Shukla Paksha (bright half)	Gā (गा) or Krishna Paksha (dark half)
1. Pāru	1. Pāru
2. Dwitiyā	2. Dwitiyā
3. Tritiyā	3. Tritiyā
4. Chauthi	4. Chauthi
5. Panchami	5.
6. Khasti	6. Khasti
7. Saptami	7. Saptami
8. Ashtami	8. Ashtami
9. Navami	9. Navami
10. Dashami	10. Dashami
11. Ekādashi	11. Ekādashi
12. Dwādashi	12. Dwādashi
13. Trayodashi	13. Trayodashi
14. Chaturdashi	14. Charhe (चह्रे)
15. Punhi (पुन्हि)	15. Āmāi (आमाइ)

== Months of the year ==
Devanagari script	Roman script	Corresponding Gregorian month	Name of Full Moon
1. कछला	Kachhalā	November	Saki Milā Punhi, Kārtik Purnimā
2. थिंला	Thinlā	December	Yomari Punhi, Dhānya Purnimā
3. पोहेला	Pohelā	January	Milā Punhi, Paush Purnimā
4. सिल्ला	Sillā	February	Si Punhi, Māghi Purnimā
5. चिल्ला	Chillā	March	Holi Punhi, Phāgu Purnimā
6. चौला	Chaulā	April	Lhuti Punhi, Bālāju Purnimā
7. बछला	Bachhalā	May	Swānyā Punhi, Baisākh Purnimā
8. तछला	Tachhalā	June	Jyā Punhi, Gaidu Purnimā
9. दिल्ला	Dillā	July	Dillā Punhi, Guru Purnimā
10. गुंला	Gunlā	August	Gun Punhi, Janāi Purnimā (Raksha Bandhan)
11. ञला	Yanlā	September	Yenyā Punhi, Bhādra Purnimā
12. कौला	Kaulā	October	Katin Punhi, Kojāgrat Purnimā

== See also ==
- Newar Buddhism
- Gunla Bajan
- Nepal Sambat
- List of Buddhist festivals
