= Dila (month) =

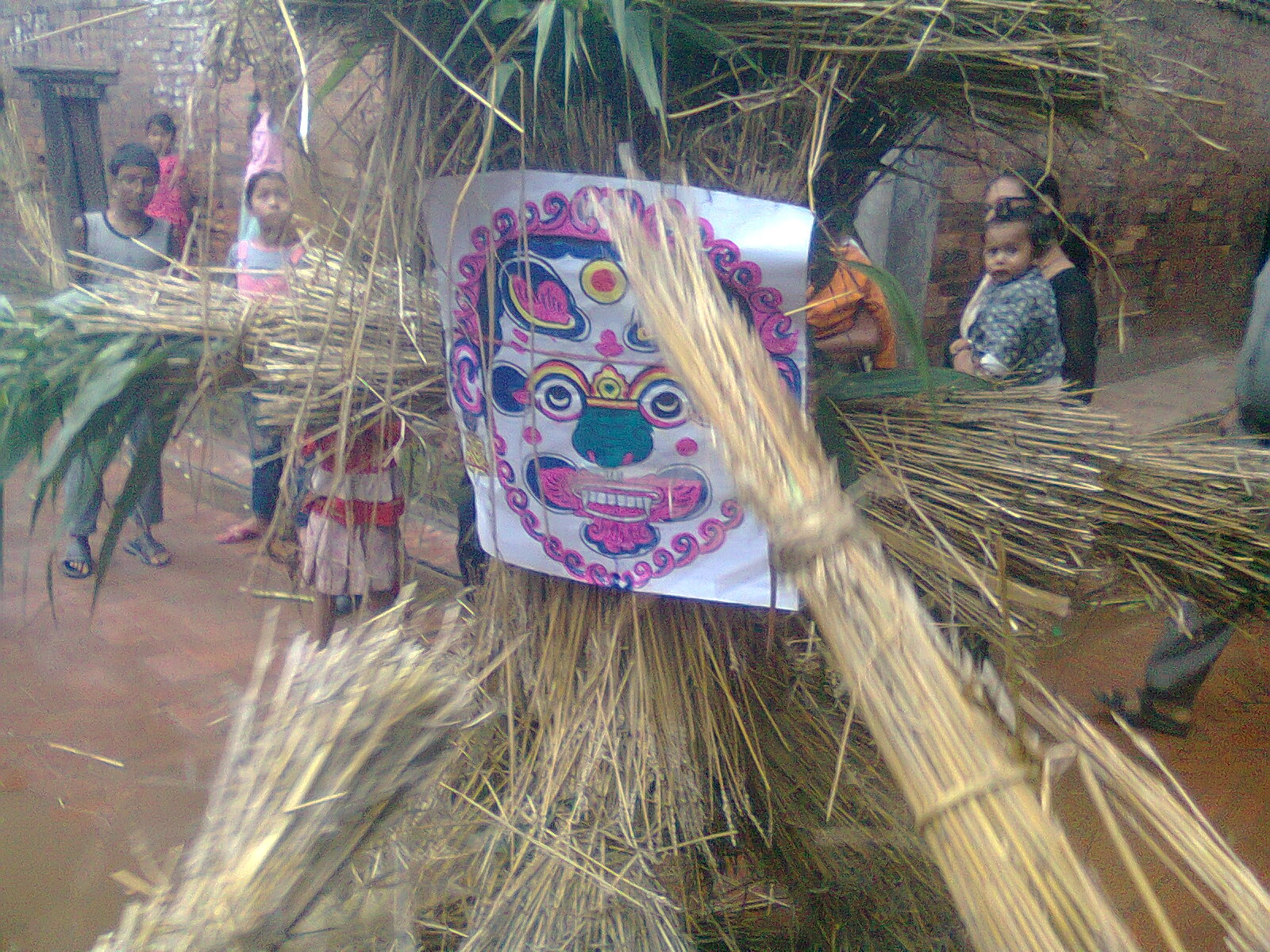
A demon effigy erected at a crossroads in Kathmandu during Gathān Mugah Charhe.

Dilā (Nepal Bhasa: 𑐡𑐶𑐮𑐵, दिला) is the ninth month in the Nepal Era calendar, the national lunar calendar of Nepal. The month coincides with Āsāṛh (आषाढ) in the Hindu lunar calendar and roughly aligns with July in the Gregorian calendar.

Dilā begins with the new moon and the full moon falls on the 15th of the lunar month. The month is divided into the bright and dark fortnights which are known as Dilā Thwa (दिला थ्व) and Dilā Gā (दिला गा) respectively.

Among the major events of the month, the 11th day of the bright fortnight is Hari Sayani Ekādashi which marks the beginning of the Hindu deity Vishnu's four-month cosmic sleep. On the 12th day, devotees plant the Tulsi plant (Holy basil) in their homes. The plant represents Vishnu.

The full moon day is Guru Purnimā when teachers are honored. The holiday is also known as Dilā Punhi and is sacred to Buddhists as the day when the Buddha gave his first sermon and set in motion the Dharmacakra, the Wheel of Dharma. The first day of the dark fortnight is the start of Vassa, the three-month rains retreat for Buddhist monks when they remain in their monasteries.

The festival of Gathān Mugah Charhe (गथां मुगः चह्रे) is celebrated on the 14th day of the dark fortnight when evil spirits are chased out of the city limits.

== Days in the month ==
Thwa (थ्व) or Shukla Paksha (bright half)	Gā (गा) or Krishna Paksha (dark half)
1. Pāru	1. Pāru
2. Dwitiyā	2. Dwitiyā
3. Tritiyā	3. Tritiyā
4. Chauthi	4. Chauthi
5. Panchami	5. Panchami
6. Khasti	6. Khasti
7. Saptami	7. Saptami
8. Ashtami	8. Ashtami
9. Navami	9. Navami
10. Dashami	10. Dashami
11. Ekādashi	11. Ekādashi
12. Dwādashi	12. Dwādashi
13. Trayodashi	13. Trayodashi
14. Chaturdashi	14. Charhe (चह्रे)
15. Punhi (पुन्हि)	15. Āmāi (आमाइ)

== Months of the year ==
Devanagari script	Roman script	Corresponding Gregorian month	Name of Full Moon
1. कछला	Kachhalā	November	Saki Milā Punhi, Kārtik Purnimā
2. थिंला	Thinlā	December	Yomari Punhi, Dhānya Purnimā
3. पोहेला	Pohelā	January	Milā Punhi, Paush Purnimā
4. सिल्ला	Sillā	February	Si Punhi, Māghi Purnimā
5. चिल्ला	Chillā	March	Holi Punhi, Phāgu Purnimā
6. चौला	Chaulā	April	Lhuti Punhi, Bālāju Purnimā
7. बछला	Bachhalā	May	Swānyā Punhi, Baisākh Purnimā
8. तछला	Tachhalā	June	Jyā Punhi, Gaidu Purnimā
9. दिल्ला	Dilā	July	Dilā Punhi, Guru Purnimā
10. गुंला	Gunlā	August	Gun Punhi, Janāi Purnimā (Raksha Bandhan)
11. ञला	Yanlā	September	Yenyā Punhi, Bhādra Purnimā
12. कौला	Kaulā	October	Katin Punhi, Kojāgrat Purnimā
