= Pwanhela (month) =

Third month of the Newa calendar

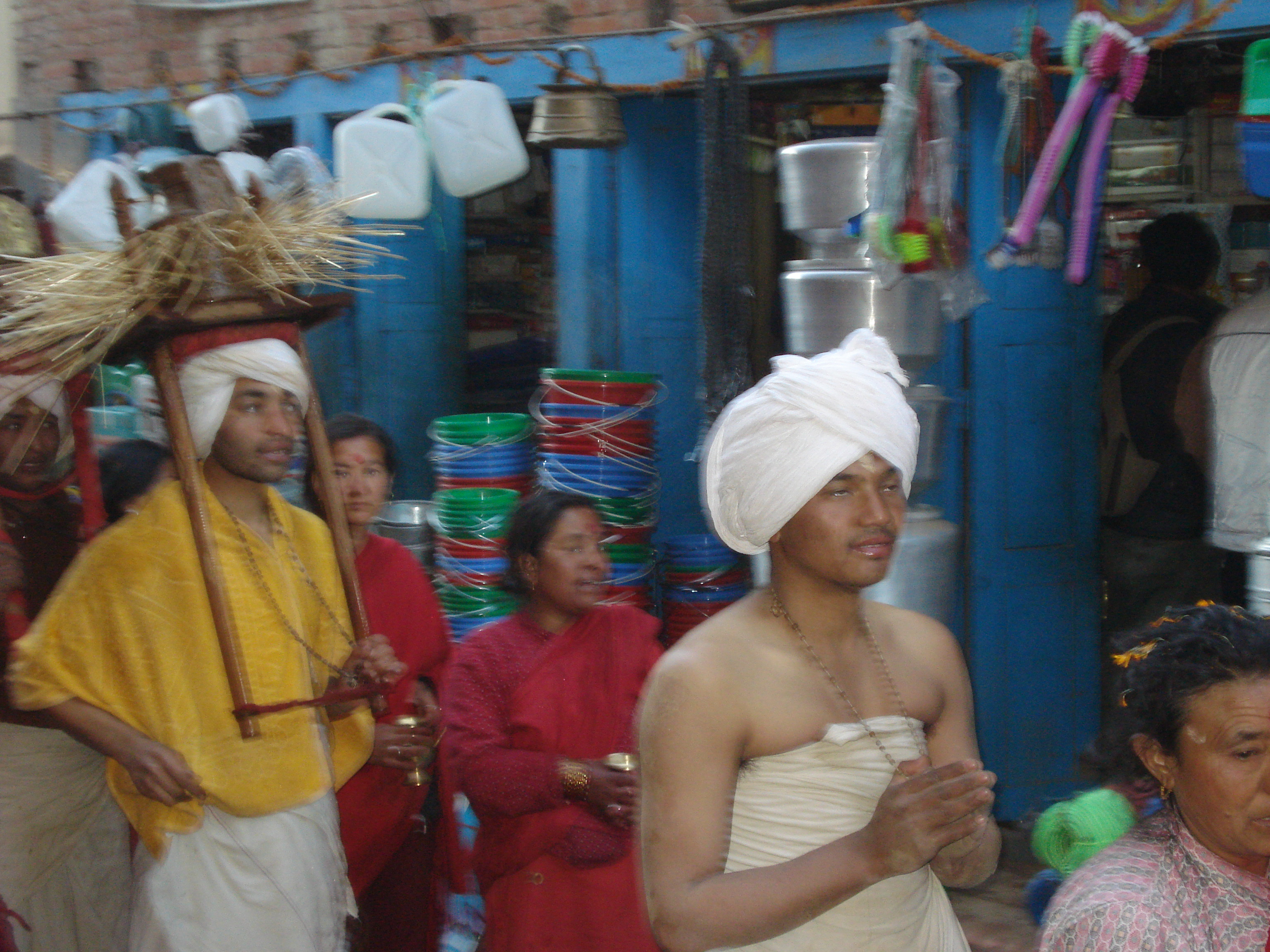
Fasting devotees during the Swasthani festival at Sankhu.

Pwanhelā (Nepal Bhasa: 𑐥𑑂𑐰𑑃𑐴𑐾𑐮𑐵, प्वँहेला) is the third month in the Nepal Era calendar, the national lunar calendar of Nepal. The month corresponds to Pausha (पौष) in the Hindu lunar calendar and roughly aligns with January in the Gregorian calendar.

Pwanhelā begins with the new moon and the full moon falls on the 15th of the lunar month. The month is divided into the bright and dark fortnights which are known as Pwanhelā Thwa (प्वँहेला थ्व) and Pwanhelā Gā (प्वँहेला गा) respectively.

The sacred bathing festival of White Machindranath, the Bodhisattva of Compassion, is held on the 8th day of the bright fortnight at the courtyard of Jana Baha in Kathmandu. On the full moon day known as Paush Purnimā, which is celebrated as Milā Punhi (मिला पुन्हि) in Nepal Mandala, the procession of the deity Changu Narayan is held in Kathmandu.

The month-long Swasthani sacred story reciting festival also starts on the full moon day. In Sankhu, a town 16 km to the east of Kathmandu, devotees fast and take daily holy dips in the Sali Nadi River throughout the month to mark the Swasthani festival. In another event, unusable clay pots are collected at market squares and broken into pieces.

== Days in the month ==
| Thwa (थ्व) or Shukla Paksha (bright half) | Gā (गा) or Krishna Paksha (dark half) |
|---|---|
| 1. Pāru | 1. Pāru |
| 2. Dwitiyā | 2. Dwitiyā |
| 3. Tritiyā | 3. Tritiyā |
| 4. Chauthi | 4. Chauthi |
| 5. Panchami | 5. Panchami |
| 6. Khasti | 6. Khasti |
| 7. Saptami | 7. Saptami |
| 8. Ashtami | 8. Ashtami |
| 9. Navami | 9. Navami |
| 10. Dashami | 10. Dashami |
| 11. Ekādashi | 11. Ekādashi |
| 12. Dwādashi | 12. Dwādashi |
| 13. Trayodashi | 13. Trayodashi |
| 14. Chaturdashi | 14. Charhe (चह्रे) |
| 15. Punhi (पुन्हि) | 15. Āmāi (आमाइ) |

== Months of the year ==
| Devanagari script | Roman script | Corresponding Gregorian month | Name of Full Moon |
|---|---|---|---|
| 1. कछला | Kachhalā | November | Saki Milā Punhi, Kārtik Purnimā |
| 2. थिंला | Thinlā | December | Yomari Punhi, Dhānya Purnimā |
| 3. प्वँहेला | Pwanhelā | January | Milā Punhi, Paush Purnimā |
| 4. सिल्ला | Sillā | February | Si Punhi, Māghi Purnimā |
| 5. चिल्ला | Chillā | March | Holi Punhi, Phāgu Purnimā |
| 6. चौला | Chaulā | April | Lhuti Punhi, Bālāju Purnimā |
| 7. बछला | Bachhalā | May | Swānyā Punhi, Baisākh Purnimā |
| 8. तछला | Tachhalā | June | Jyā Punhi, Gaidu Purnimā |
| 9. दिल्ला | Dillā | July | Dillā Punhi, Guru Purnimā |
| 10. गुंला | Gunlā | August | Gun Punhi, Janāi Purnimā (Raksha Bandhan) |
| 11. ञला | Yanlā | September | Yenyā Punhi, Bhādra Purnimā |
| 12. कौला | Kaulā | October | Katin Punhi, Kojāgrat Purnimā |
