= Mohani =

Newar festival in Nepal

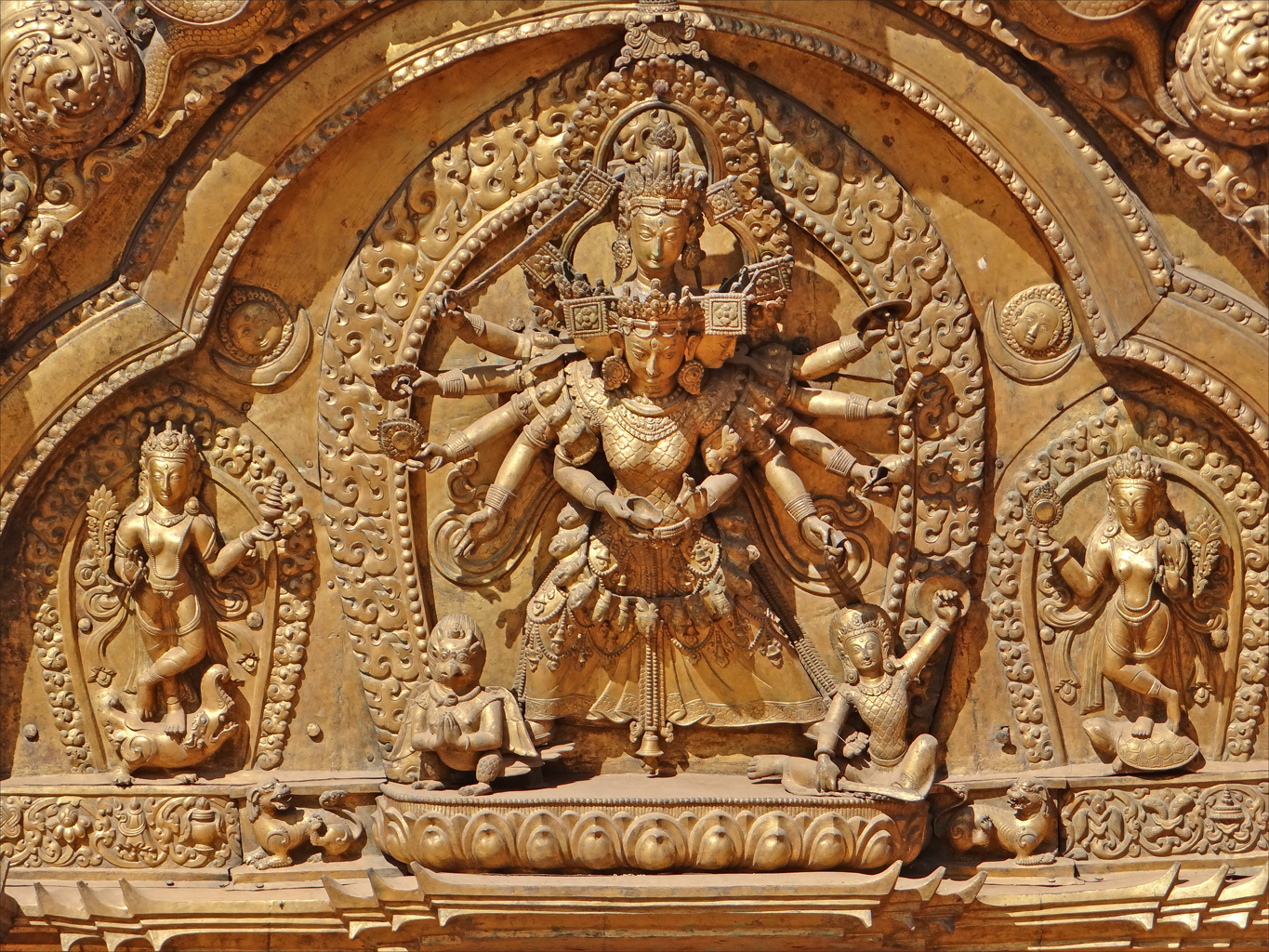
- The Goddess Taleju, an aspect of Devi, is worshipped during the festival.
- Observed by: Newar people
- Type: Religious, cultural
- Observances: Worship of Tutelary deity, Veneration of tools of the trade, Sword processions, Sacred masked dances
- Begins: first day of the bright fortnight of Kaula
- Ends: full moon day of Kaula
- Date: the month of Kaula (October – November)
- Related to: Dasain

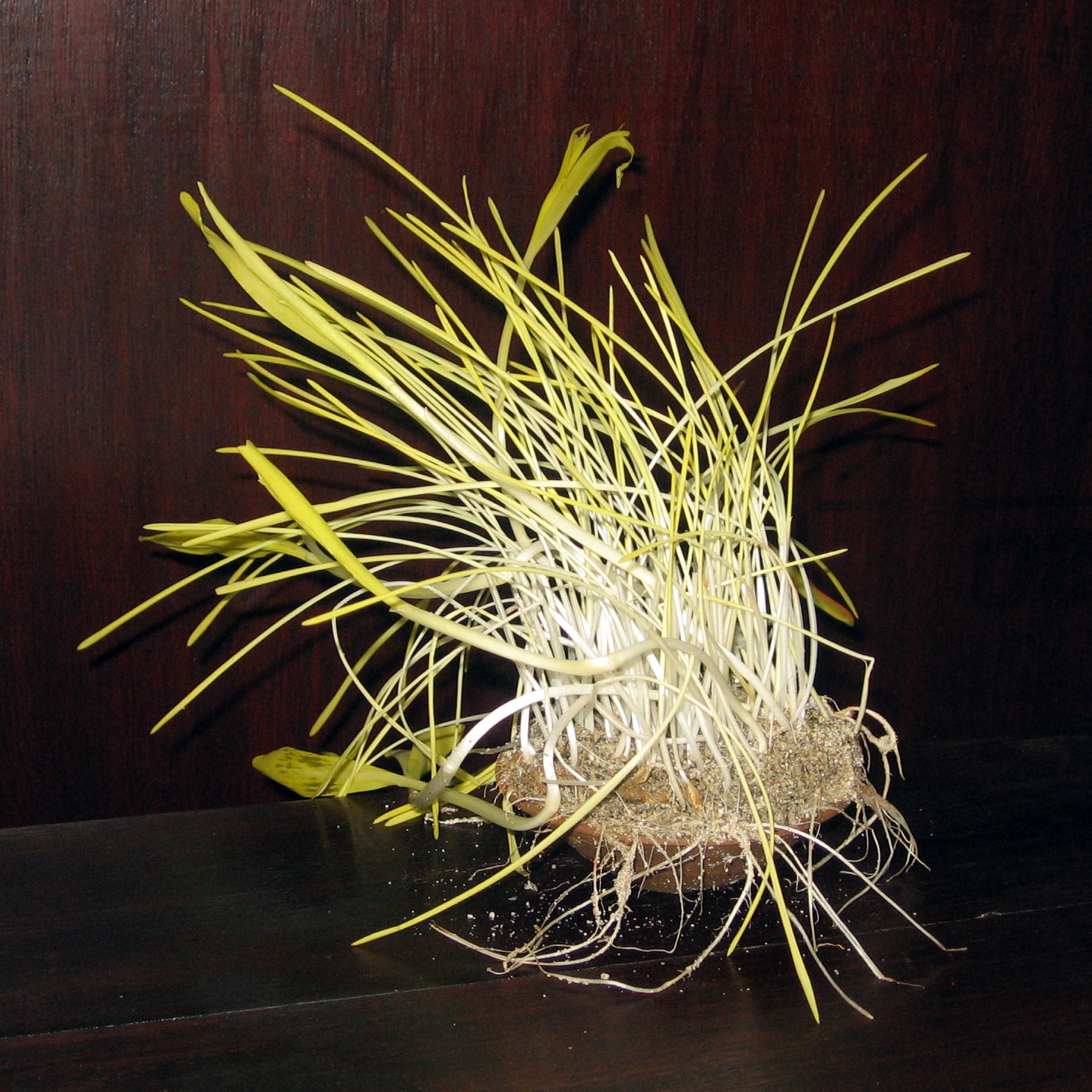
Nalāswān or barley shoots

Mohani (Nepal Bhasa: 𑐩𑑀𑐴𑑂𑐣𑐷 or 𑐩𑑀𑐴𑐣𑐷; from Classical Newar: 𑐩𑐴𑐣𑐷, mahani), also known as Moni or Mohni is an annual religious festival celebrated by the Newar people of Nepal. It is analogous to Dashain, a Hindu festival celebrated in South Asia, although Mohani is celebrated by both Hindus and Buddhists. The festival is based on the lunar calendar and starts on the first day of the bright fortnight of Kaula, around late September and lasts for fifteen days till the full moon.

The festival involves a packed itinerary of religious services, pilgrimages, family gatherings and outdoor celebrations lasting several days. Special dinners known as Nakhtya (𑐣𑐏𑑂𑐟𑑂𑐫𑐵), to which all the relatives are invited, continue for weeks later. The festival is also dedicated to Taleju, the tutelary goddess of the Malla kings.

The festival has been variously described as a celebration of Hindu Goddess Durga slaying the demon Mahisasur, Goddess Chamunda destroying the demon Chunda and Indian emperor Ashoka renouncing arms in disgust after a particularly bloody battle and becoming a Buddhist. Mohani is celebrated according to the lunar calendar, so the dates are changeable. The main celebrations last for four days from the 8th to the 11th days of the bright half of Kaulā (कौला), the twelfth month in the lunar Nepal Era calendar.

== Etymology ==
The modern name of the festival, Mohani, is derived from the Classical Newar word, mahani. According to Gautama Vajracharya, the word mahani derives from the Sanskrit word Mahanavami, literally the ninth great day, which is the name for the ninth day and the most important day of the festival.

== Family events ==
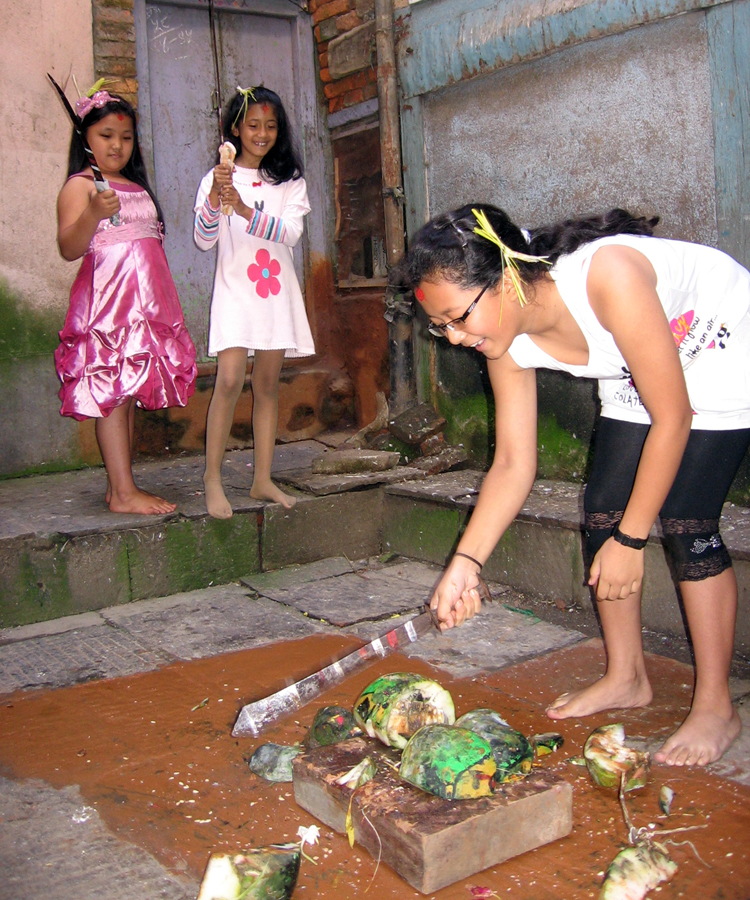
Girls chop up an ash gourd symbolising the destruction of evil.

Mohani starts with Nalāswane (नःलास्वने), the planting of barley seeds, on the first day of the fortnight. The seeds are planted in sand in earthen basins and small bowls. This is done in the shrine room at one's home and at the Agam Chhen (आगं छेँ) the house where the family's tutelary deity is installed.

A week later, a family feast known as Kuchhi Bhoy (𑐎𑐹𑐕𑐶 𑐨𑑂𑐰𑐫𑑂) is held on the day of Ashtami, the eighth day of the fortnight as per the lunar calendar. Family members sit in a row for the feast with the eldest taking the place of honor at the top and the youngest at the bottom.

The next day, known as Syākwa Tyākwa (स्याक्व त्याक्व), is Navami, the ninth day of the fortnight in the lunar calendar. Sacred rituals are performed at the shrine room of the tutelary deity. People also make sacred offerings to their tools of the trade, weighing scales, looms, machinery and vehicles. The Taleju Temple located at Kathmandu Durbar Square, Patan Durbar Square and Bhaktapur Durbar Square are opened to the public on this day only, and devotees visit the temple to offer worship to the goddess, who is also the tutelary deity of Nepal's Malla kings of old. The day ends with another grand family feast.

The next day is Chālan (चालं), which occurs on Dashami, the tenth day of the fortnight. Family members go to the shrine room of their tutelary deity for a service. They receive bunches of barley shoots planted on the first day as sacred gifts. Dabs of red paste are put on their foreheads as a blessing.

Other ceremonies consist of chopping up an ash gourd painted with the face of the devil at the shrine house of the tutelary deity. In some localities, participants parade through the streets holding ceremonial swords aloft prior to the event. The procession is known as Pāyā (पाया). The festivities end with another family feast in the evening.

== Community events ==
The Pachali Bhairav Jātrā is a procession held in Kathmandu to honor the deity Pachali Bhairav whose shrine is located at the southern part of the historic section of the city. The parade takes place on the fifth day of the fortnight.

The Sikāli Jātrā is a sacred masked dance festival which is held as part of the celebrations of Mohani. It takes place in Khokana, a village to the south of Kathmandu, on the seventh day of the fortnight. The festival consists of dance performances and religious rituals, and continues for five days.

In Bhaktapur, the masked dance of Nava Durgā is held. Nava Durga means group of nine goddesses who are believed to protect the city from external harm. Nine shrines dedicated to the deities mark the city's perimeter.

At a courtyard inside the old royal palace at Patan, masked dancers representing Asta Matrikā (eight mother goddesses) reenact the victory of Goddess Durga over the demon Mahisasur. The performances were begun in the 17th century. The Asta Matrika Dance is also performed to remove obstacles in the city caused by bad spirits. Worshipping the eight goddesses is believed to bring good to the country and the people.

In Bunga, 9 km south of Kathmandu, a festive parade of Goddess Manakamana is held on the ninth day of the fortnight. A dance featuring a masked man riding a hobby horse is also shown, among other performances.

Asanbhalu Dyah Jātrā, also known as Annapurna Jatra, is held on the 11th day of the fortnight. An image of the goddess Asanbhalu Ajimā, the patron deity of Asan, Kathmandu, is placed on a palanquin and carried around town accompanied by musical bands. The Asan Pāyā sword procession is also held on this day, with the youngest member of the community leading the parade. The day is the last day of Mohani for the locals of Asan, and is known as Asan Chālan.

The sacred Kumha Pyakhan dance used to be performed at Durbar Square and Asan as symbolic protection of the image of the goddess Taleju when it is brought out of her temple during Mohani.

== Music of the season ==
The Malshree dhun(मालश्री धुन) is played and heard during this time. The joyous melody is one of the six seasonal tunes in traditional Newar music.

== Kite flying ==
Flying kites is the most popular sport that people engage in on the sidelines of Mohani. This is the season for flying kites because of the pleasant weather and windy conditions. Rooftops and open fields are crowded with revelers, and dogfights in the sky in which kite fliers try to cut the opponent's line with one's line are keenly watched. The kites are highly maneuverable, and are flown using a spindle. The line is coated with mājā, a sticky paste mixed with powdered glass to help cut the opponent's line.

The most common social belief regarding the tradition of flying kites is that kites go up to the heavens carrying a message to the gods to stop sending rain for the year. Another belief says that it brings prosperity to the family. Flying kites is also believed to be a way of communicating with one's ancestors.

== Celebrations outside Nepal ==
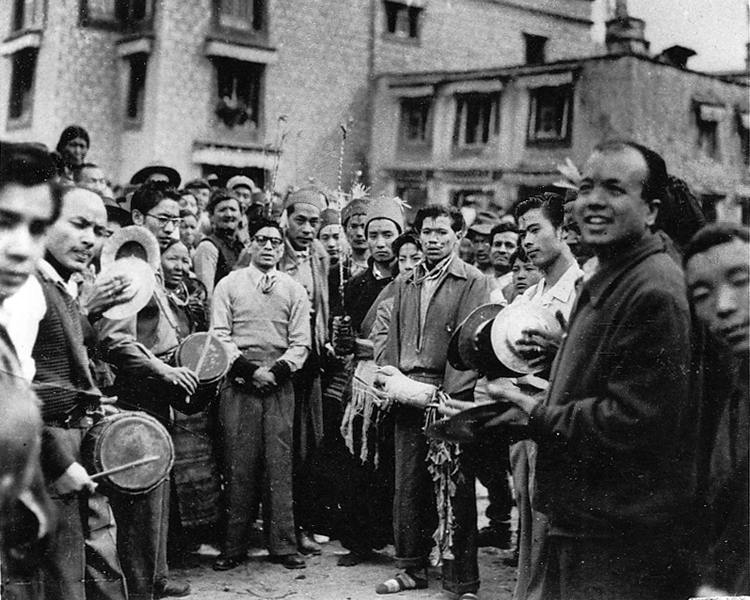
Paya procession in Lhasa, ca. 1950s

Newar expatriates in Tibet used to celebrate Mohani like in Kathmandu, and they held the Paya procession on the 10th day of the fortnight. In Lhasa, the participants holding swords paraded around the Barkhor accompanied by musical bands playing nāykhin (नायखिं) drums. They went to the Nepalese Legation for the ceremony where they chopped up a radish. After the ceremony, they returned to their own places in a similar procession.

There was another pageant in which the merchants carried a huge demon mask. The parade was led by a few men dressed in women's clothes. The Paya ceremony was also celebrated in other towns in Tibet like Shigatse and Gyantse where there were Lhasa Newar merchants and artisans.

In recent years, with Nepalese migrating to various parts of the world to work or settle, they have been celebrating their festivals wherever they reside with community feasts and cultural programs.

== Gallery ==
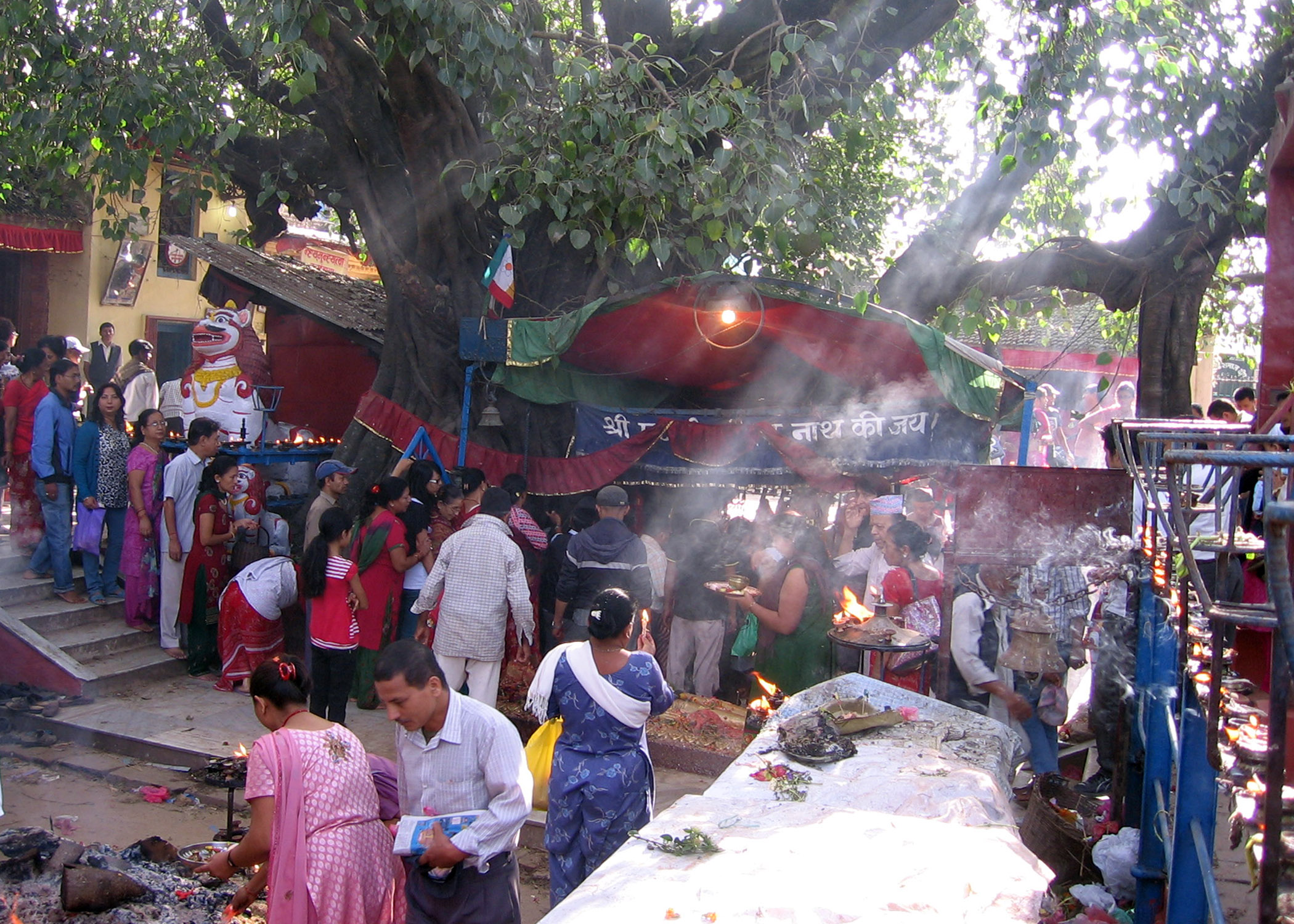
Devotees at temple of Pachali Bhairav

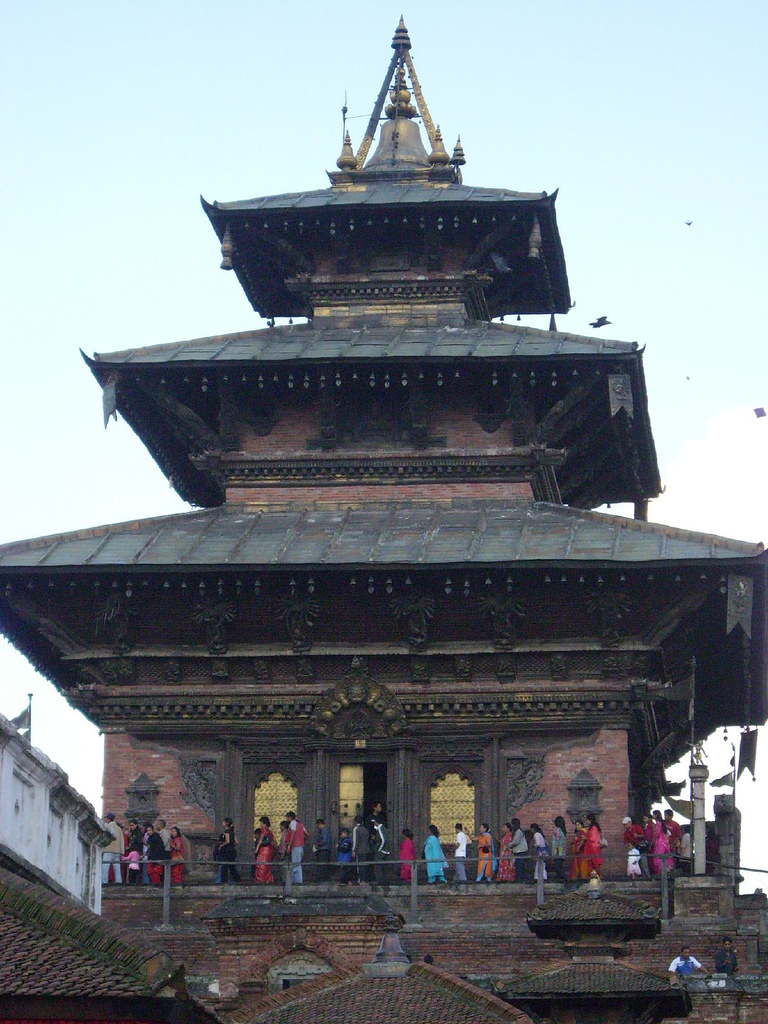
Taleju Temple, Kathmandu

== See also ==
- Dasain
- Vijayadashami
- Durga Puja
