= Paksha =

Fortnight or a lunar phase in a month of the Hindu lunar calendar

Phases of the Moon

Paksha (Sanskrit: पक्ष, romanized: pakṣa) refers to a fortnight period consisting of various lunar phases in a month of the Hindu lunar calendar. Literally meaning "side" in Sanskrit, it refers to the periods between amavasya (new moon) and purnima (full moon), and vice versa.

A lunar month in the Hindu calendar has two fortnights, with each fortnight subdivided into lunar days called tithis. A paksha consists of 15 such tithis, each of which correspond to a 12-degree angular motion of the Moon. The fortnight between amavasya and purnima is called as Shukla Paksha (bright side) or Gaura Paksha, which corresponds to the period of the waxing moon. The second fortnight is called Krishna Paksha (dark side) or Vadhya Paksha' and corresponds to the period of the waning moon. Amavasya corresponds to the period when the Moon is within 12 degrees of angular distance from the Sun before their conjunction.

A lunar month begins on the next day after amavasya in the amanta tradition and on the next day after purnima in the purnimanta system. The amanta system is followed majorly in the South India and the purnimanta system in North India.

== Shukla Paksha ==
Shukla Paksha refers to the bright lunar fortnight in the Hindu calendar, corresponding to the waxing moon. Shukla is the Sanskrit word for "white" or "bright". The Shukla Paksha is a period of 15 days, which begins after the amavasya (new moon day) and culminating on purnima (full moon day) and is considered auspicious.

Numerous festivals are held during this period, including the Navaratri festivals, most importantly Chaitra Navaratri and Ashvin Navaratri.

Day	Tithi	Festival	Month
1st day	Pratipada	Gudi Padwa, Ugadi	Chaitra
1st day	Pratipada	Bali Pratipada, Govardhan Puja	Kartika
2nd day	Dvitiya	Bhaibeej	Kartika
3rd day	Tritiya	Teej	Bhadrapada
3rd day	Tritiya	Akshaya Tritiya	Vaishakha
4th day	Chaturthi	Ganesh Chaturthi	Bhadrapada
4th day	Chaturthi	Ganesh Jayanti	Magha
5th day	Panchami	Nuakhai	Bhadrapada
5th day	Panchami	Vivaha Panchami	Margashirsha
5th day	Panchami	Vasanta Panchami	Magha
6th day	Shasthi	Sitalsasthi	Jyestha
8th day	Ashtami	Radhashtami	Bhadrapada
9th day	Navami	Rama Navami	Chaitra
10th day	Dashami	Vijayadashami	Ashvin
11th day	Ekadashi	Shayani Ekadashi	Ashadha
11th day	Ekadashi	Vaikuntha Ekadashi	Margashirsha
14th day	Chaturdashi	Samvatsari	Bhadrapada
15th day (full moon)	Purnima	Guru Purnima	Ashada

== Krishna Paksha ==
Krishna Paksha refers to the dark lunar fortnight in the Hindu calendar, corresponding to the waning moon. Krishna means "dark" in Sanskrit. Krishna Paksha is a period of 15 days, which begins after the purnima day (full moon), and ends on the amavasya (new moon) day. The period is considered inauspicious, as the moon loses light during this period.

Festivals during the Krishna Paksha are:

Day	Tithi	Festival	Month
4th day	Chaturthi	Karva Chauth	Kartika
8th day	Ashtami	Krishna Janmashtami	Śrāvaṇa
13th day	Thrayodashi	Dhanteras	Kartika
13th day	Thrayodashi	Pradosha	Magha
14th day	Chaturdashi	Maha Shivaratri	Magha
14th day	Chaturdashi	Naraka Chaturdashi (Diwali)	Kartika
15th day (no moon)	Amavasya	Lakshmi Puja (Diwali)	Kartika

== Thithis or days ==
Shukla Paksha	Krishna Paksha
1. Prathama	1. Prathama
2. Dvitiya	2. Dvitiya
3. Tritiya	3. Tritiya
4. Chaturthi	4. Chaturthi
5. Panchami	5. Panchami
6. Shashti	6. Shashti
7. Saptami	7. Saptami
8. Ashtami	8. Ashtami
9. Navami	9. Navami
10. Dashami	10. Dashami
11. Ekadashi	11. Ekadashi
12. Dwadashi	12. Dwadashi
13. Trayodashi	13. Trayodashi
14. Chaturdashi	14. Chaturdashi
15. Purnima	15. Amavasya

== See also ==
- Hindu astronomy
- Hindu units of measurement
- Pitru Paksha
- Śrāddha
