= Jana Baha Dyah Jatra =

Chariot festival in Nepal

Seto Machhendranath Jatra / Jana Baha Dyah Jatra
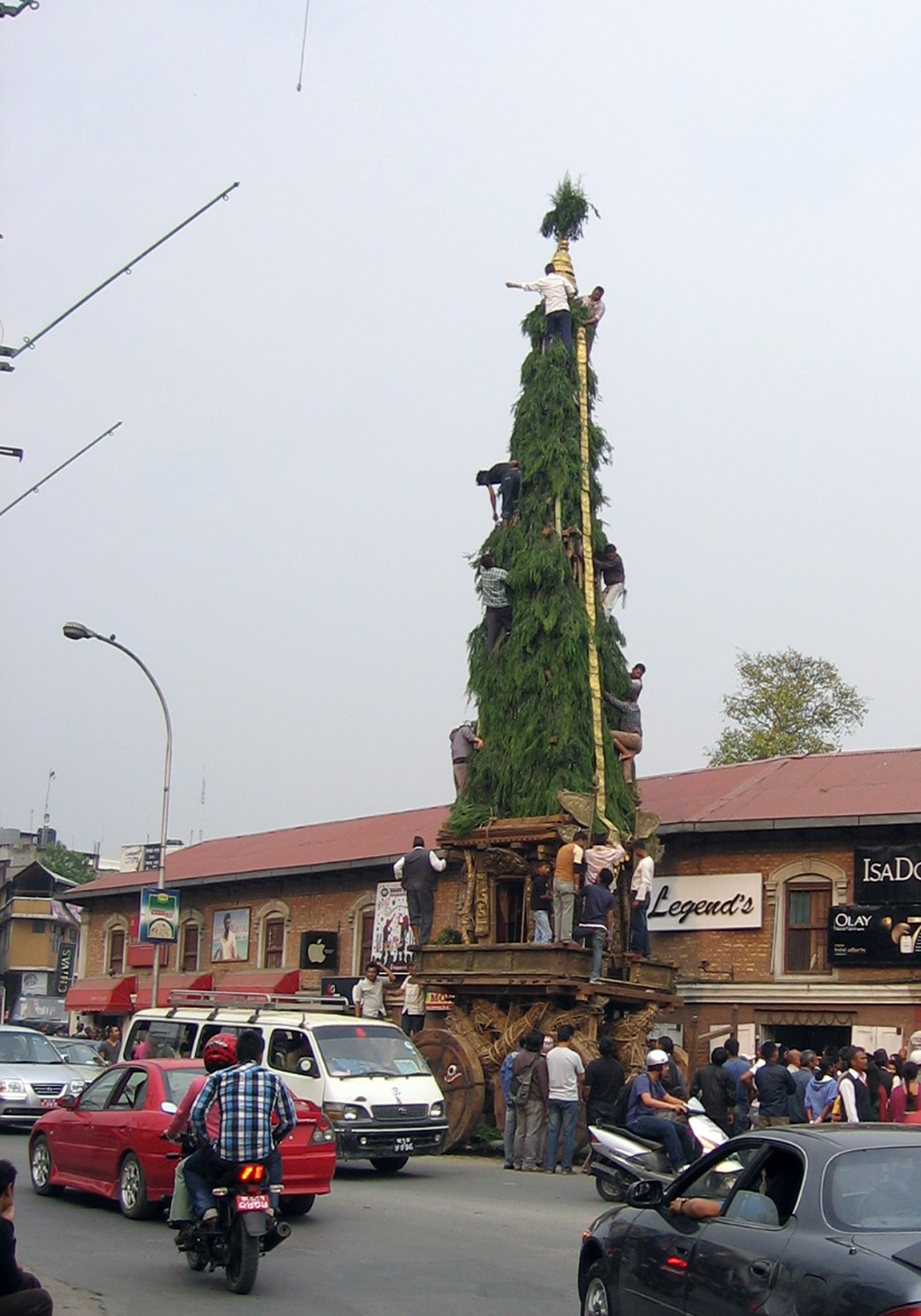
- Chariot of Jana Baha Dyah at Durbar Marg
- Observed by: Nepalese
- Type: Religious
- Significance: Spreads peace in the city
- Celebrations: Chariot procession
- Begins: End of March (Chaitra Sukla Aastami)
- Duration: 3 days
- Related to: Janabaha Dyo or Avalokiteśvara, Karunamaya

Seto Machindranath Jatra (Nepali: सेतो मच्छिन्द्रनाथको रथयात्रा), also known as Jana Bahā Dyaḥ Jātrā (Newar: जन: बहा: द्य जात्रा) is the chariot procession of Jana Baha Dyah, the Bodhisattva of Compassion, which is held annually in Kathmandu. It begins on the 8th day and ends on the 10th day of the bright fortnight of Chaulā (चौला), the sixth month in the lunar Nepal Era calendar. The Buddhist deity is known in Sanskrit as Aryavalokitesvara (Sacred Avalokiteśvara), and also White Machhendranath or White Karunamaya and Guanyin by Chinese. It is believed that the annual procession was begun to provide the townspeople who were unable to visit his temple a sight of the image.

== History ==
There is a tradition that the image of Jana Baha Dyah housed in the temple at Jana Baha, Kel Tol was retrieved from Jamal, hence the chariot procession starts from there. Chronicles show that the festival was well established in the 17th century, but may have originated in the 6th century or earlier.

One legend is that the Karunamaya was found in the fields by a Jyapu (farmer in Newa Community) at Jamal the exact spot where the Chariot is made.

== The procession ==
During the festival, the image of Jana Bāhā Dyah is removed from his temple at Jana Baha and carried in a portable shrine to Durbar Marg where the actual procession begins. There it is installed in a car built in the shape of a tower on wheels. The chariot is 35 ft high.

When the image is placed on the chariot, a group of musicians from the Kansakar caste play a short fanfare on their long trumpets to announce the installation. At the same time, the Guruju Paltan, a ceremonial guard of honor consisting of soldiers dressed in ancient uniforms, performs a feu de joie with their muskets. Crowds then pull the chariot through central Kathmandu accompanied by musical bands.

The journey is performed in three stages to permit devotees to make oblations. Worshippers bring trays of offerings and light rows of butter lamps to honor the deity wherever the chariot stops. Sweet marjoram flowers (मूस्वां) are special offerings on the occasion.

== The route ==
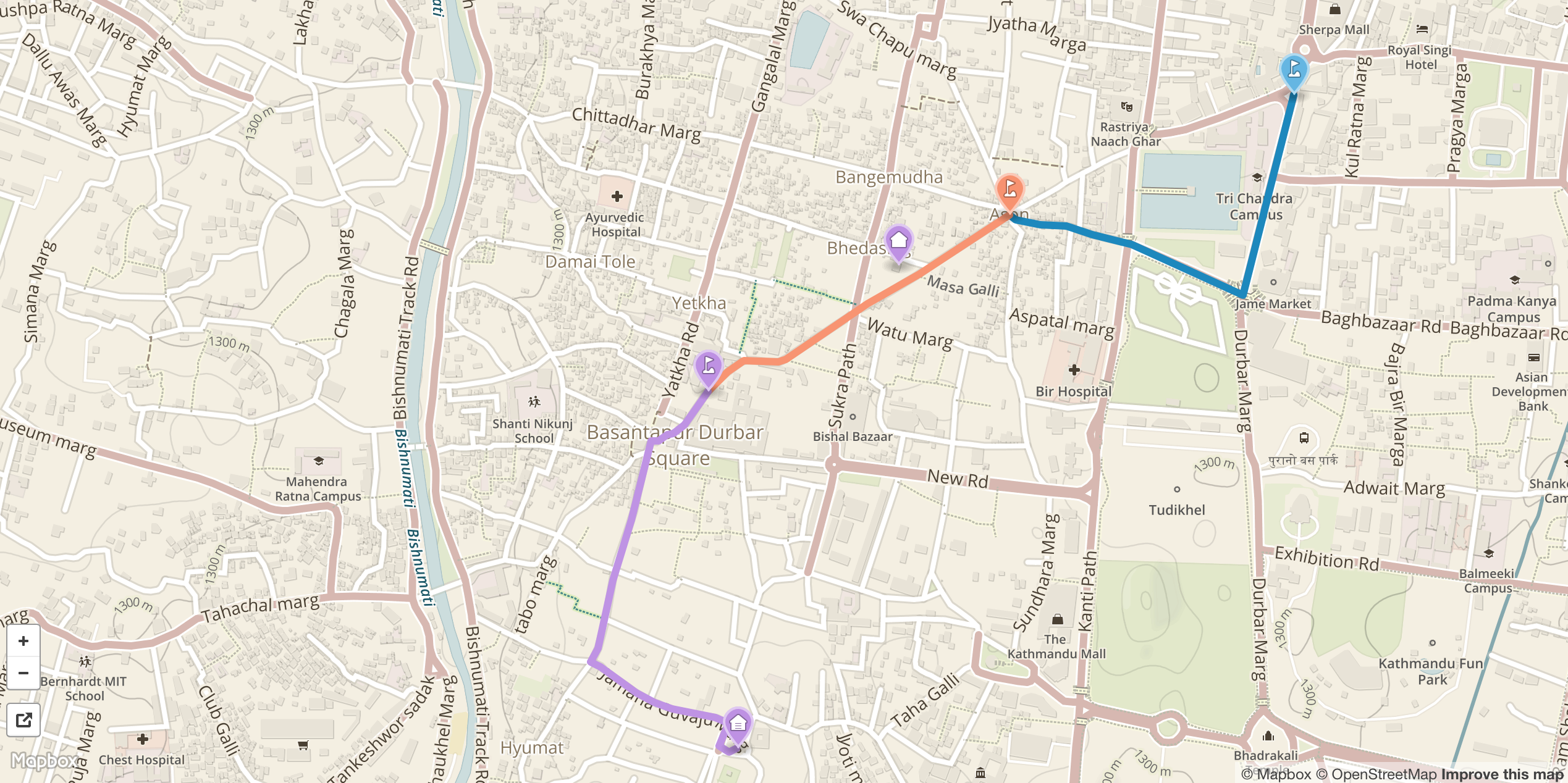
Route taken by Janabaha Dyah Jatra in Kathmandu

On the first day, the chariot is pulled from Jamal, Durbar Marg through Bhotahiti to Asan where it makes an overnight halt. The next day, the chariot is pulled through Indra Chok to Kathmandu Durbar Square where it makes its second stop. On the third day, the chariot is pulled through Maru and Chika: Mugha: Chikan Mugal to Lagan at the southern end of the historic section of Kathmandu.

There the procession ends after the chariot makes three rounds of the temple housing the mother of Janabaha Dyo. The idol is then carried back to the temple at Jana Baha, and the chariot is disassembled and the parts stored for next year.

The three-day parade is one of the two great chariot festivals in Kathmandu, the other being Kumari Jatra during Yenya Punhi. The date of the chariot procession of Jana Baha Dyah is changeable as it is celebrated according to the lunar calendar.

Similar chariot processions known as Bunga Dyah Jatra are celebrated in Lalitpur and Dolakha in April–May.

== Gallery ==
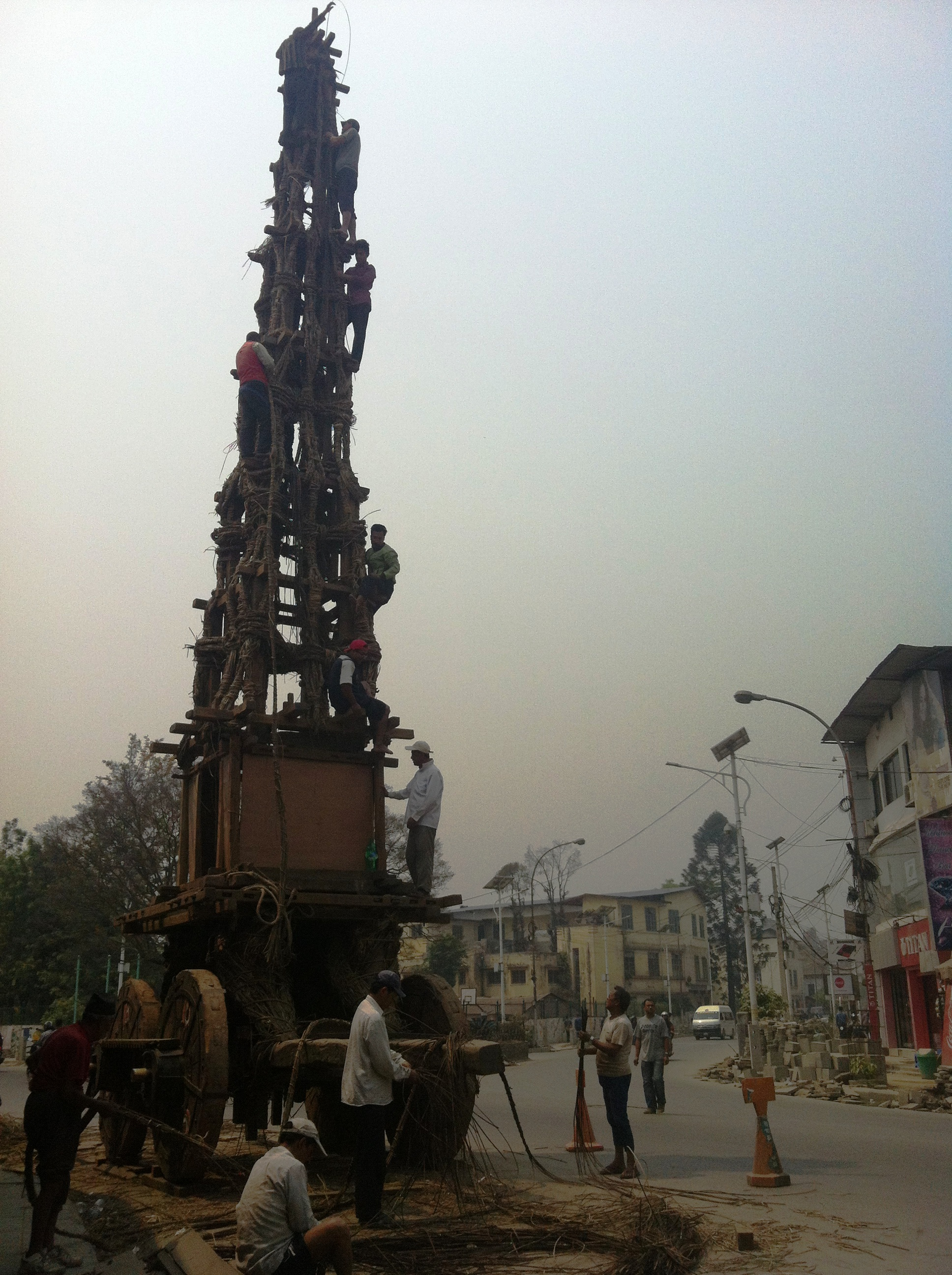
The chariot being built

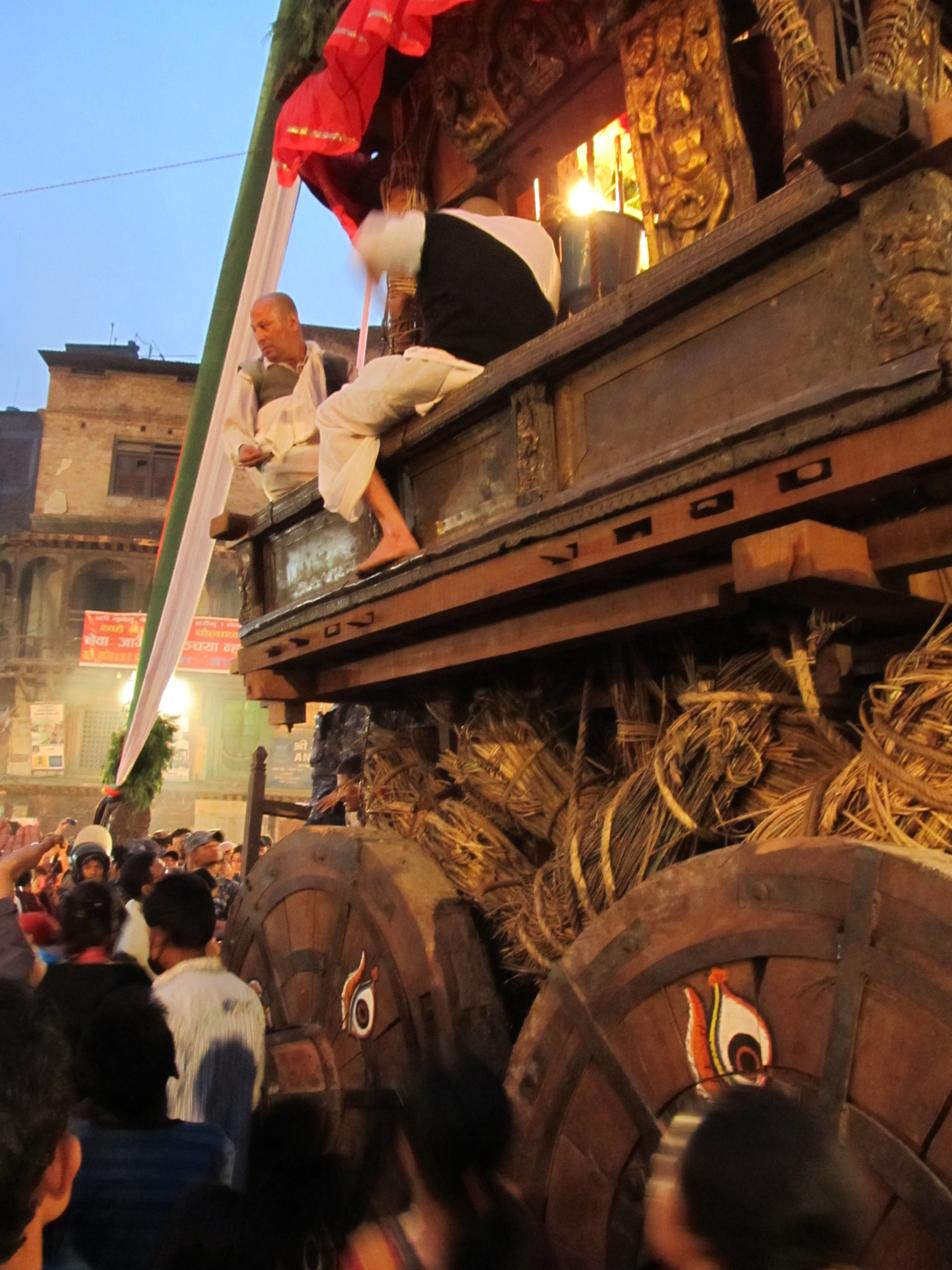
Detail of the chariot

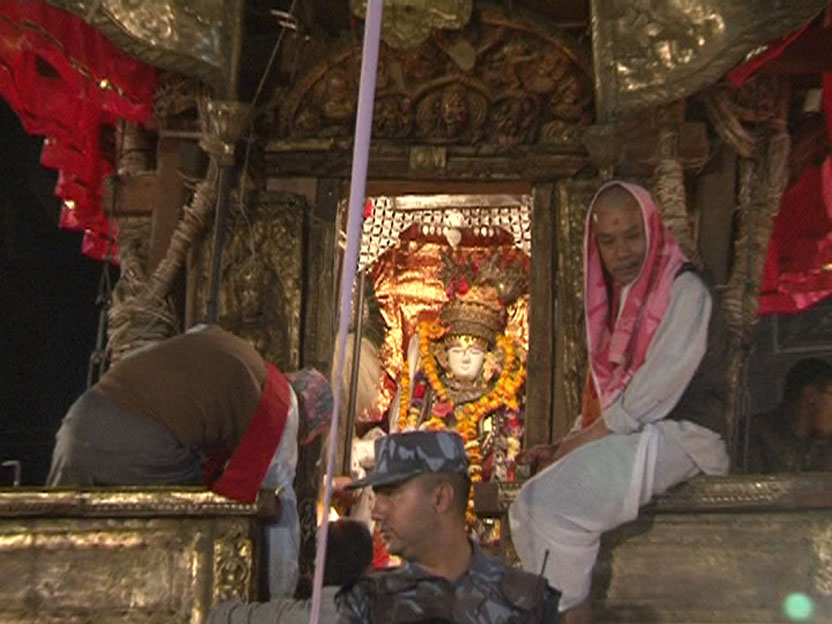
Jana Baha Dya inside the chariot

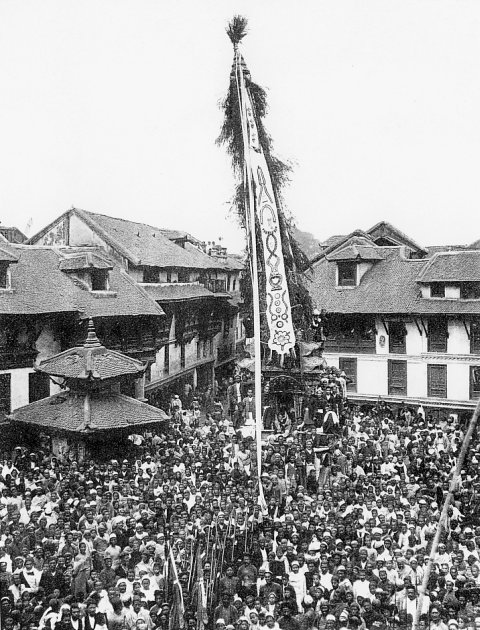
Chariot at Asan, circa 1915

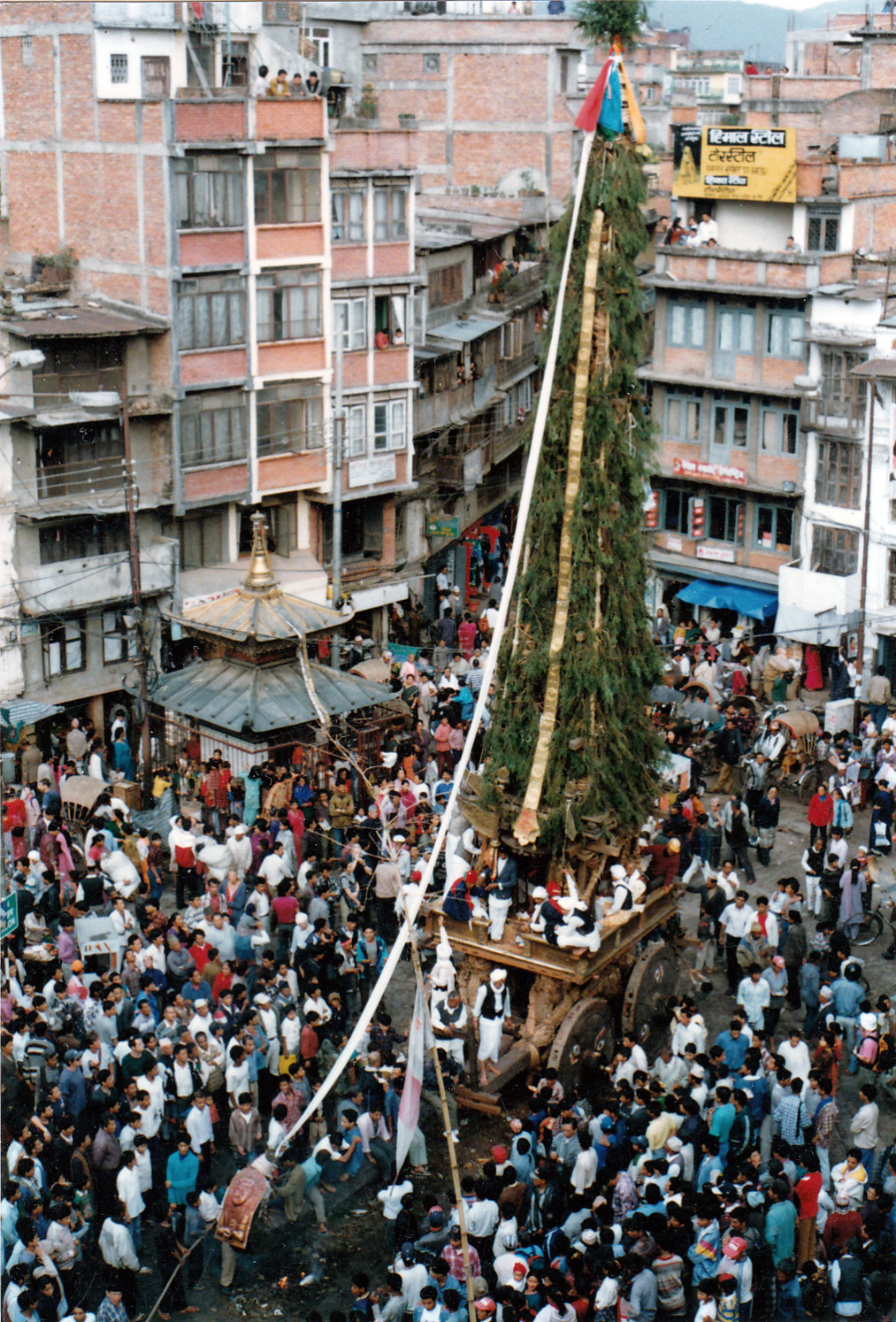
Chariot at Asan in 1999

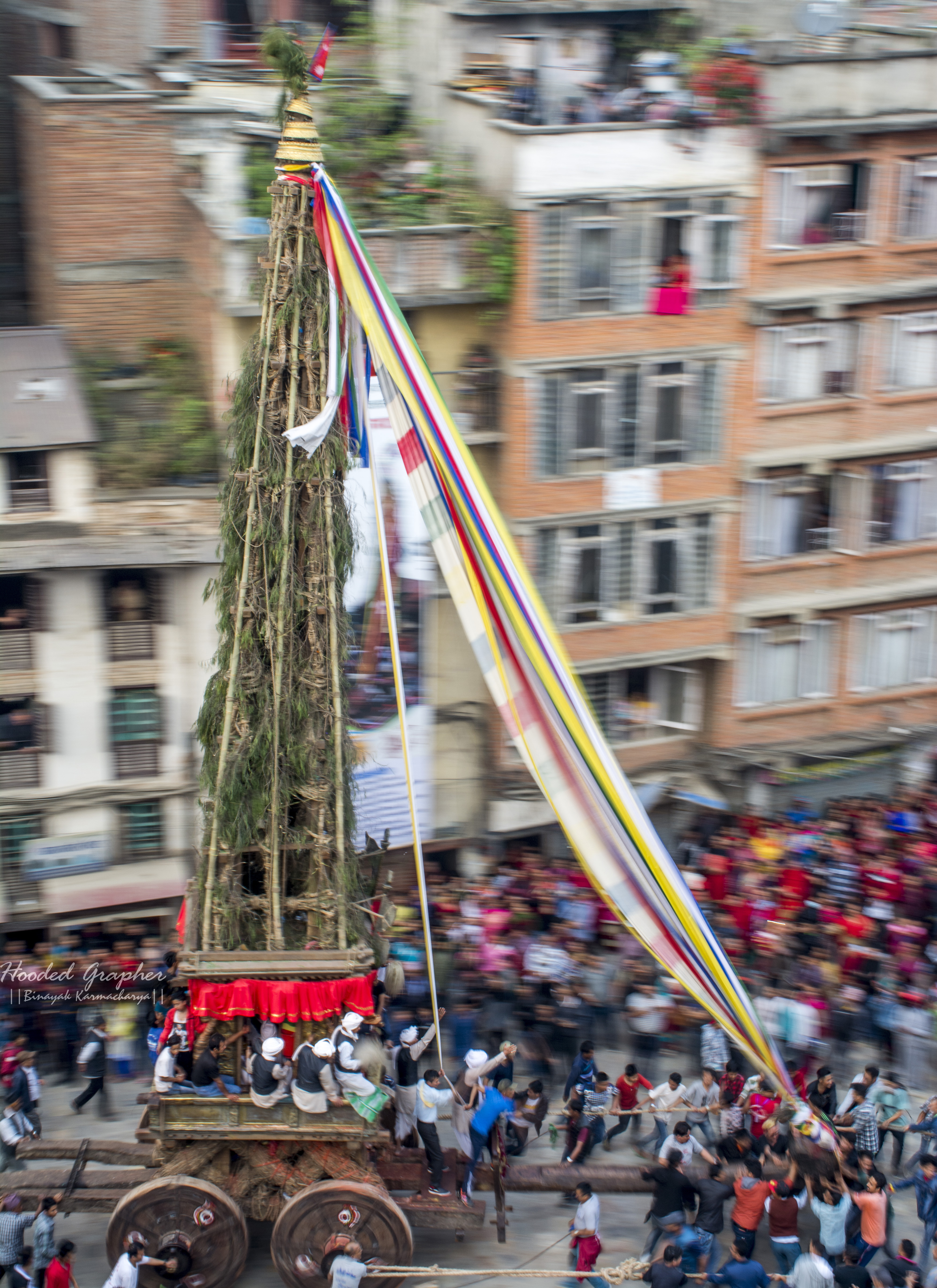
Chariot procession in 2018

== See also ==
- List of Buddhist festivals
- Red Matsyendranath Jatra
- Buddhism in Nepal
- Vajrayan Buddhism
