= Jana bahal =

Newar Buddhist temple in Nepal

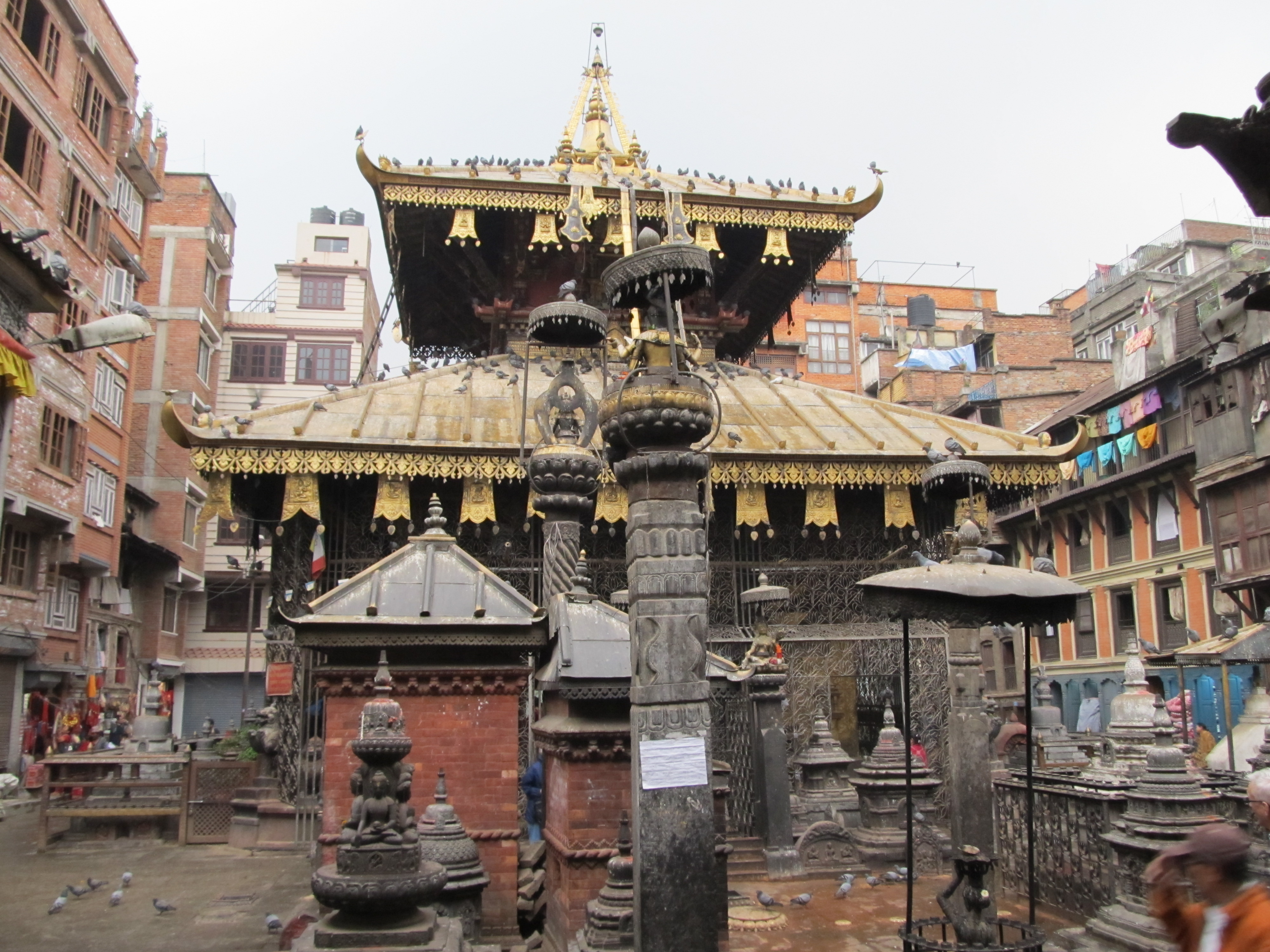
Temple of Karunamaya at Jana Baha

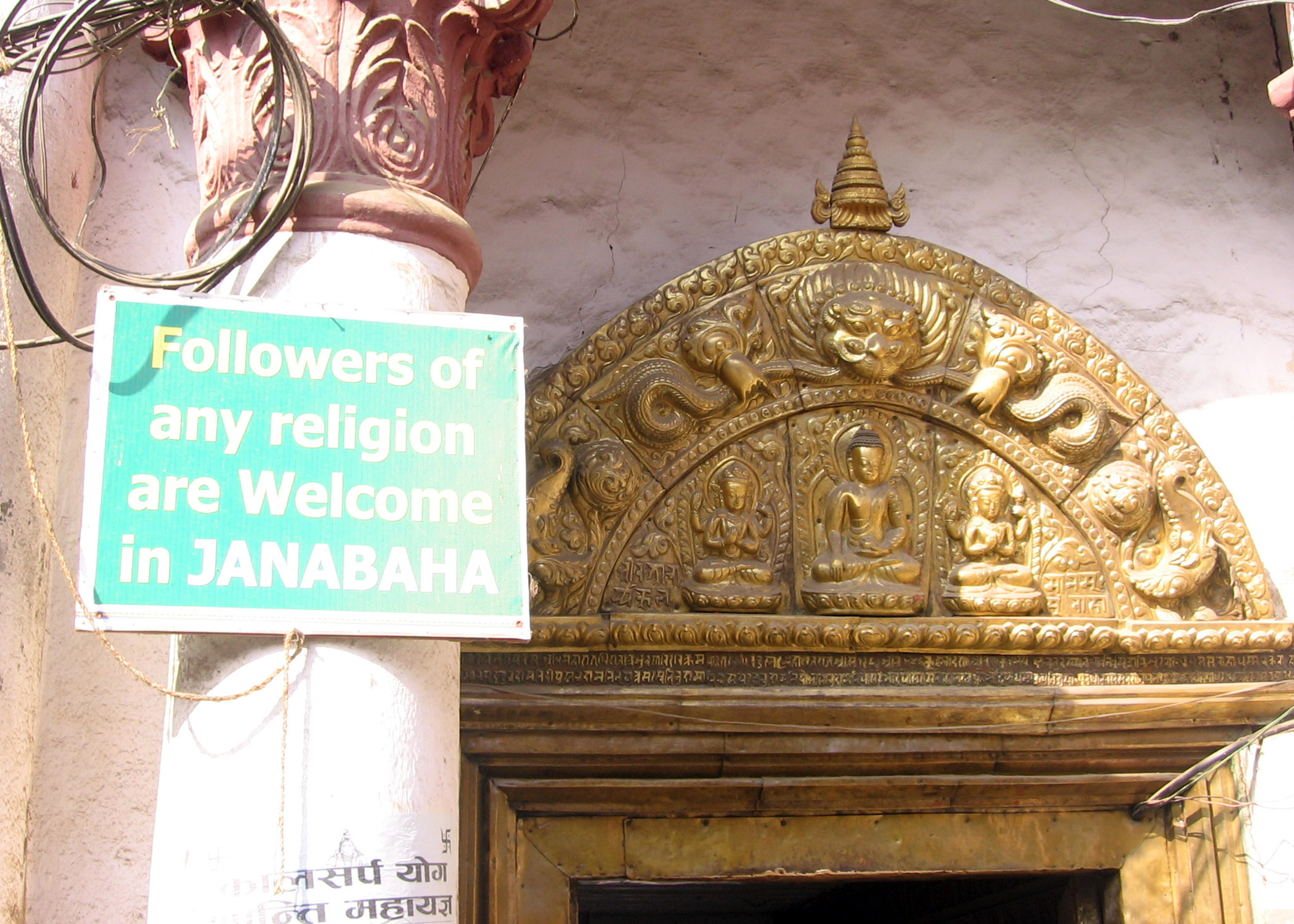
Entrance to Jana Baha, Kel Tol

Jana Bahal (Nepal Bhasa:जन बहाः), often called Janabahaa: and also called Machindra Bahal and less frequently Kanak Chaitya Mahavihar, is one of the few Bahal which have fully fledged storied temple standing in the middle of a court. The main deity residing in the temple is the Seto Machindranath also known as Janabaha Dyo, Aryavalokitesvara and Karunamaya.

== Historical background ==
Janabahal originally was known as “Kanak Chaitya Mahavihar”, but after deity of Seto Machindranath was mounted here the courtyard began to be referred as Jahabaha:. The name Kanak Chaitya Mahavihar is from a chaitya of Kanakmuni Buddha in front of the temple, situated in the courtyard. From this we can assume that the bahal was originally a place for Buddhist religious activities. It is said that Janabahaa: Dyo: dates back to 4th century BC but the temple at Janabahal was built by King Yaksha Malla in 1502 AD. It is also believed that kings who followed Buddhism erected the image of various Lokeswaras inside the courtyard.

== Major cultural activities ==
Beside the main Jana Baha Dyah Jatra (chariot festival), the visitors, mostly Buddhists, visit and pray to the Seto Machindranath deity. They count the beads tied in the Japamala and move the beads in the process of praying. Newar Buddhists perform uposadhavrata (a kind of fasting) every Ashtami by doing saptavidhanutara satvapuja and by offering pate (parasol). They also perform satpuja during which toncha, batti, prasad all are offered in equal quantity of 1000. In the premises of Kanak-Muni Buddha‟s chaitya, Barey Chwiu is done for the young males of Shakya, Buddhacharya and Bajracharya caste. Newars often organizes the program of lighting the palas around the temple or lighting 108 diyos. This shrine is mainly visited on the day of Purnima, Ashtami and Sanhu (Sankranti) by the Hindus. The daily ritual of the temple starts from around 4 am by the priests.
