= Seto Machindranath =

Newar Buddhist representation of Avalokiteshvara in Kathmandu, Nepal

Karunamaya at Jana Baha

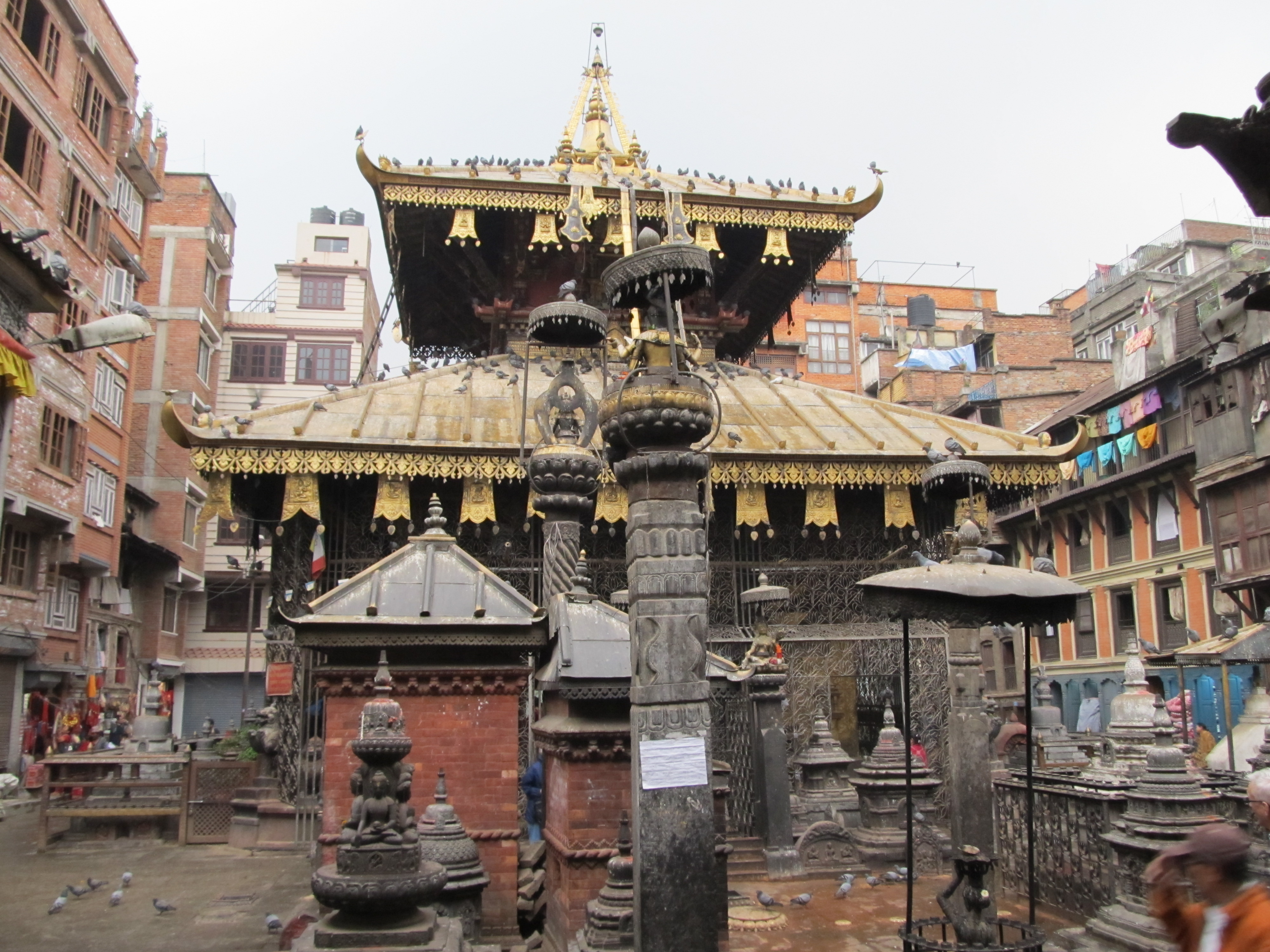
Temple of Karunamaya at Jana Baha

Seto Machindranath, also known as Janabaha Dyo, Avalokiteśvara, Karunamaya, Guanyin is a deity worshiped by both Hindus and Buddhists in Kathmandu, Nepal. The temple of Seto Machindranath is located in Jana Bahal (also known as Machhindra Bahal). Located at Keltole between Asan and Indra Chok in central Kathmandu, the temple is believed to have been established around the 10th century. Seto Machindranath is worshiped as an aspect of Avalokiteshvara.

Every year, the deity's image is placed in a chariot and paraded around Kathmandu in a festival known as Jana Baha Dyah Jatra. The deity is bathed and repainted every year as a ritual that symbolizes the changes occurring throughout one's life.

== Legend ==
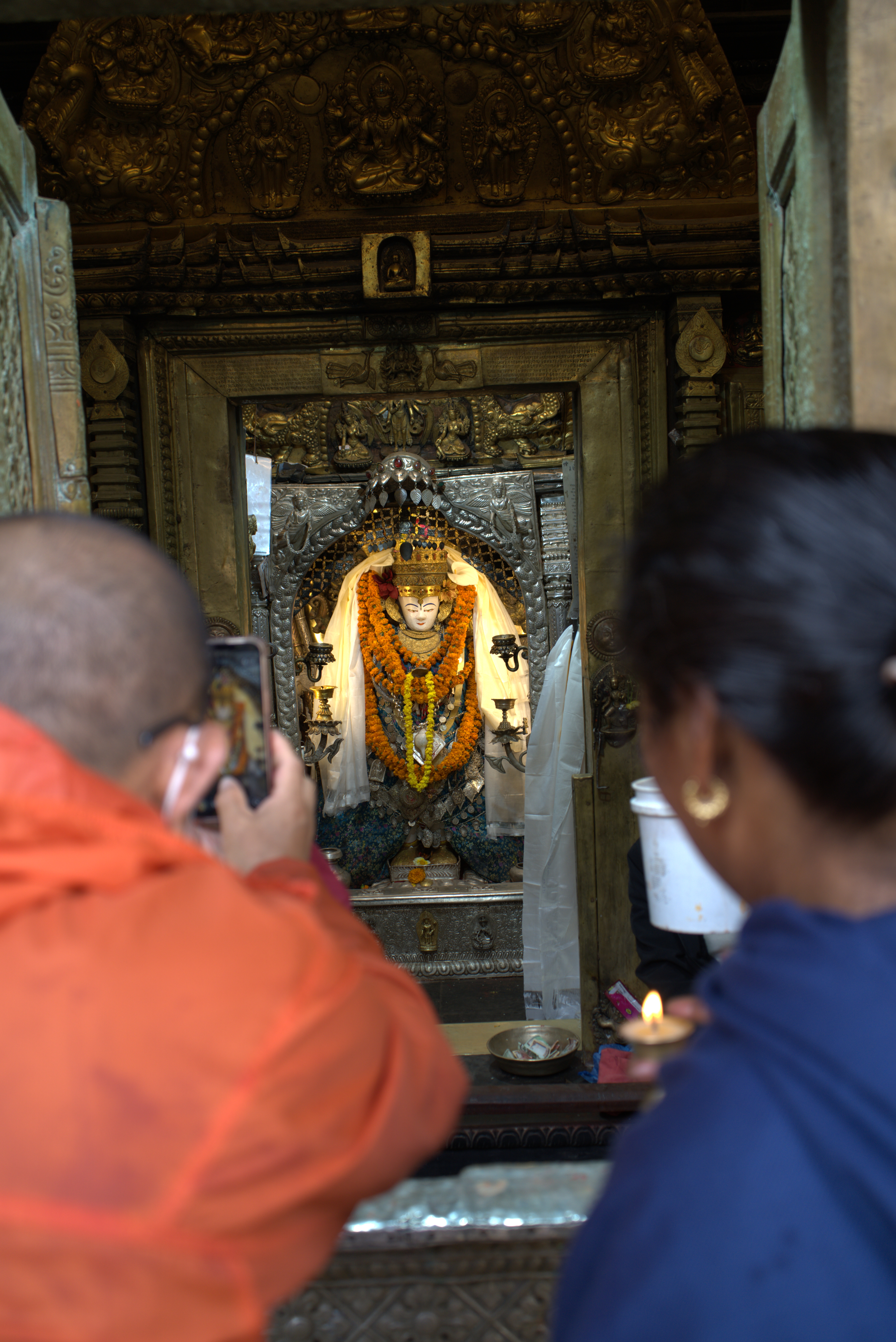
A devotee praying the deity, "Seto Macchindranath". This temple is located at Ason, Kathmandu.

It is believed that during the rule of King Yakshya Malla, in a place called Kantipuri people used to bathe in the holy river and visit Swayambhunath this led them to heaven after death. Once Yamraj (God of Death) realised the power of Swayambhunath and he visited the holy temple. During his return from the Temple, he was captured by King Yakshya Malla and his Tantric Guru and demanded immortality. So Yamraj sought Arya Awalokiteshwor's (Seto Machindranath) assistance to free him. The god heard his request and instantly appeared from the water. The god was white in color with eyes half closed. He then told the king to build a temple where Kalmati and Bagmati meet and to organize chariot procession so that the god could visit the people and bless them with happiness and long life.

== Chariot festival ==
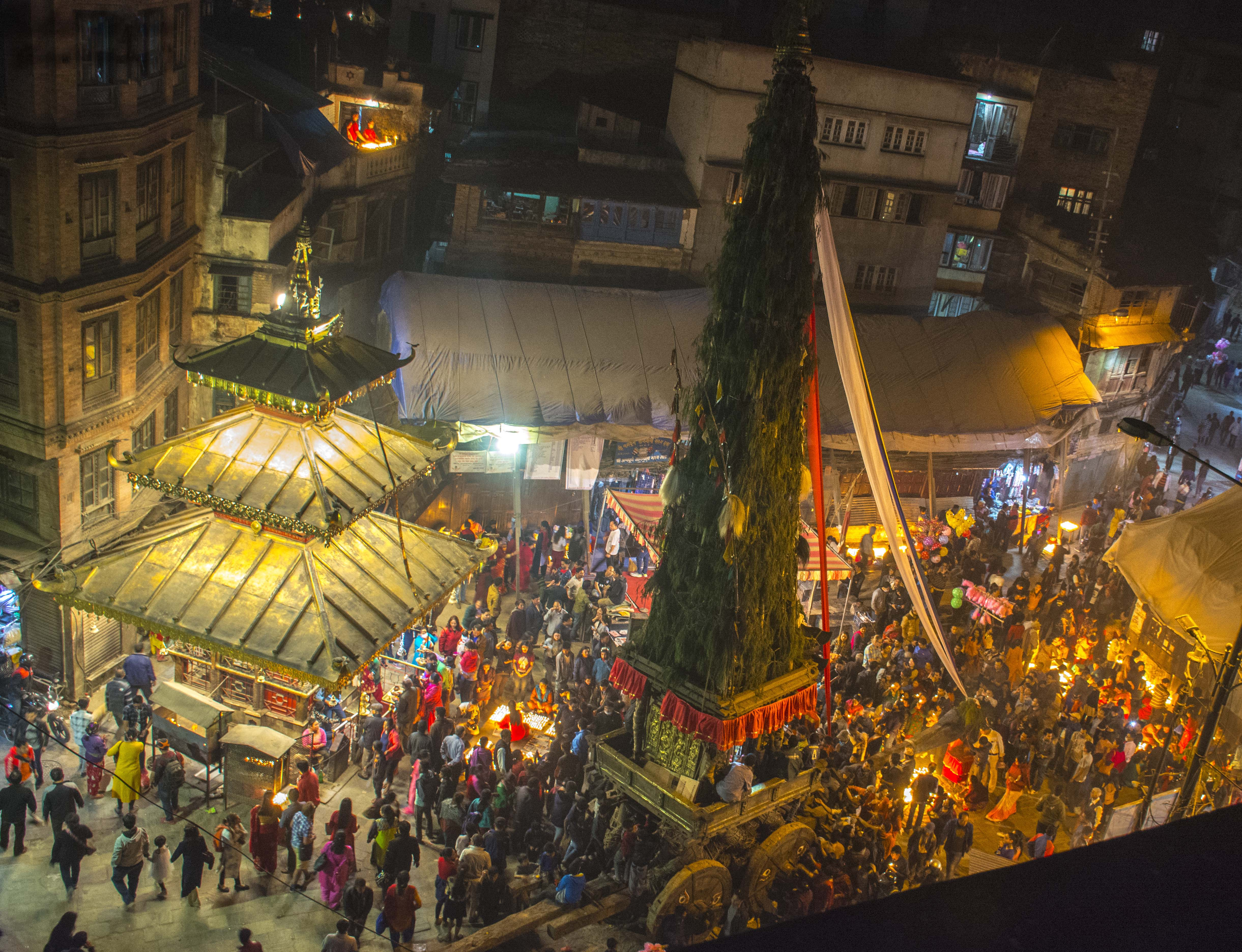
Jana Baha Dyah Jatra

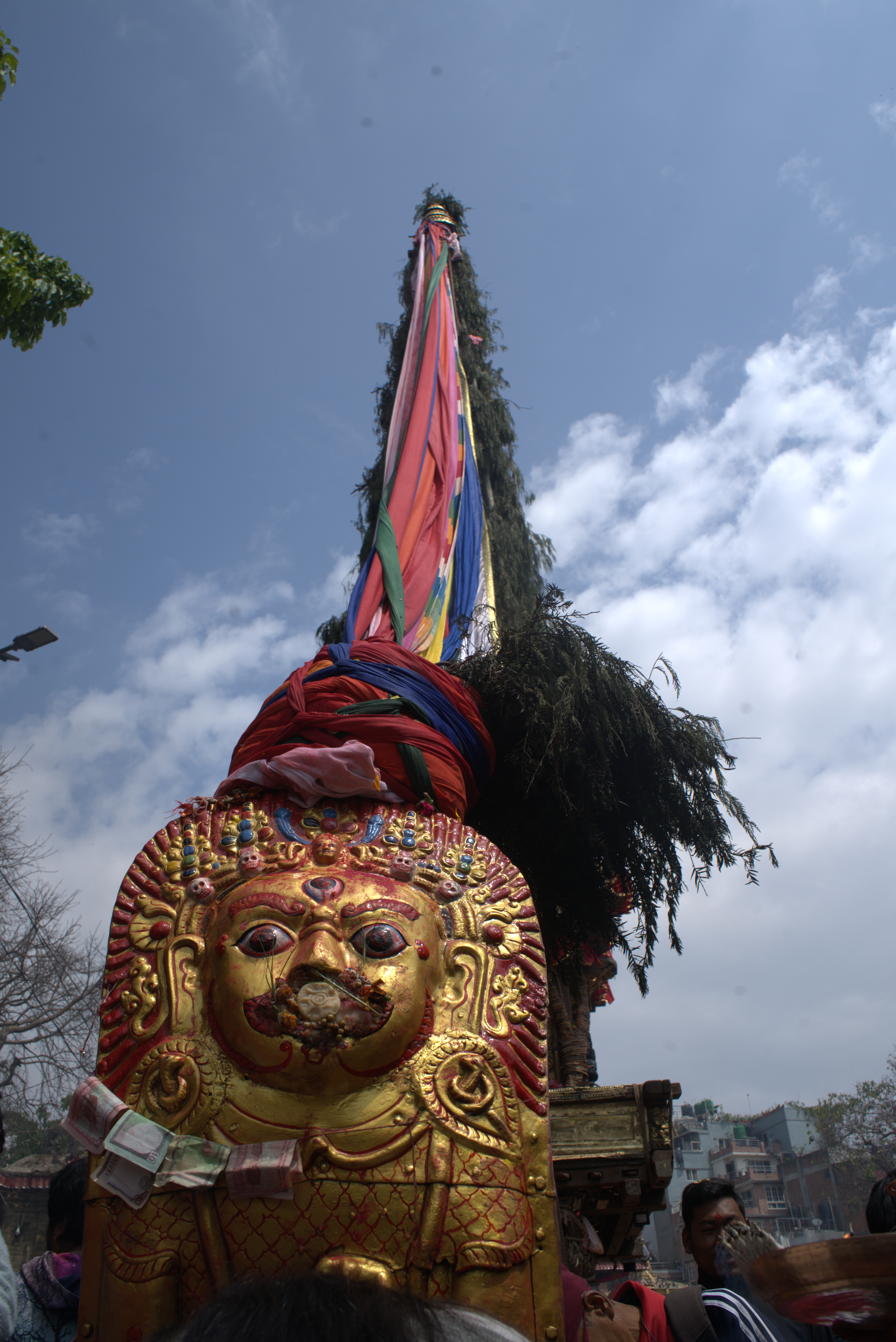
The chariot image of "Seto Macchindranath" Jatra.

The 32 hands tall chariot procession festival of Seto Machindranath is celebrated during the month of Chaitra. This is five days long festival. The chariot of Seto Machindranath is pulled from place to place during these five days. Each day when the chariot has reached its destination a group of soldiers fires their rifles into the air.

On the first day, the deity is brought to Jamal by the priests. Then it is pulled to Asan, Kathmandu via Ratna Park and Bhotahity. The next day it is pulled from Asan Kathmandu to Hanuman Dhoka. Third day, it is pulled to Lagantole via Maruhity and Jaisideval. On fourth day, the chariot completes three rounds of a temple there in Lagan, dedicated to his mother. Finally on the fifth day, the idol of Seto Machindranath travels back to temple in Jana Baha. During all five days, people come and pay their respect to the Deity.

== Ritual ==
In the month of Poush every year, the deity is bathed and repainted. The ceremony is held on the 8th day of the bright fortnight of Pohelā (पोहेला), the third month in the lunar Nepal Era calendar. In this event, the deity is brought into the courtyard of the temple. All of the ornaments and clothes of the deity are taken off. Then the deity is bathed in several containers of water both cold and hot, milk, ghee, and honey. All of the actions are carried out by the priests of the temple. The main highlight of this event is that the living goddess Kumari attends this ritual.
