= Dvadashi =

Twelfth day of the lunar month in the Hindu calendar

Dvadashi (Sanskrit: द्वादशी, romanized: Dvādaśī), also rendered Dwadashi, is the twelfth lunar day (tithi) of the shukla (bright) or krishna (dark) fortnight, or Paksha, of every lunar month in the Hindu calendar.

Dwadashi is regarded to be suitable for the veneration of the sacred tulasi tree and the worship of Vishnu. It marks the end of the three-day ekadashi fast, starting on dashami.

== Occasions ==
- The Kurma Dwadashi is dedicated to the worship of Kurma, the second avatar of Vishnu. It is celebrated on Dwadashi (twelfth day) of Shukla Paksha (waxing phase) of Pausha month. The same day is celebrated as Pratishtha Dwadashi i.e. establishment day for Ram Lalla vigrah at Ramjanmbhumi Mandir at Ayodhya.
- The Govinda Dwadashi or Narasimha Dwadashi, which falls in the month of Phalguna, celebrates the Narasimha Avatar of Vishnu, before Holi.
- The Rama Lakshmana Dwadashi is important for begetting a son.
- The Vamana Dwadashi, also called Onam, venerates Vamana, the fifth incarnation of Vishnu, and the visit of Mahabali.
- The Govatsa Dwadashi is the first day of celebrations on Diwali, on which cows are worshiped as symbolic to mothers; nourishing mankind, and being the chief means of livelihood and religious sanctity in rural India.
- The Dwadashi marks the Sripada Vallabha Aradhana Utsav of Sripada Sri Vallabha, at Pithapuram Datta Mahasamsthan in the state of Andhra Pradesh.
- The saint-poet Annamacharya died on Phalguna Bahula (Krishna) Dvadashi (12th day after full moon) in the year Dhundhubhi, on 4 April 1503 after living for 95 years.
- The Shukla Paksha Dvadashi is the prophesied date for the birth of the Kalki avatar of Vishnu.

== See also ==
- Chaitra
- Paksha
- Govatsa Dwadashi
