= Tritiya =

Third day of the lunar fortnight

Tritiya (Sanskrit: 'third') is the third day in the lunar fortnight (Paksha) of the Hindu calendar. Each month has two Tritiya days, being the third day of the "bright" (Shukla) and of the "dark" (Krishna) fortnights respectively. It is called as Tadige in Kannada.

== Festivals ==
- Teej, a festival for Hindu women, occurs on Tritiya in the month of Shraavana.
- Akshaya Tritiya occurs on Tritiya in the month of Vaishakha.
