= Chaturdashi =

Fourteenth day of the lunar month in the Hindu calendar

Chaturdashi (Sanskrit: चतुर्दशी, romanized: caturdaśī) is the 14th day (tithi) of the waxing phase or waning phase of the moon in the Hindu calendar. This is the day prior to new moon (amavasya) or full moon (purnima).

== Etymology ==
Chatur means four and dashi means the tenth day in Sanskrit, literally meaning, "fourteenth".

== Festivals ==
- Naraka Chaturdashi is observed before the amavasya of the month of Ashvina.
- Maha Shivaratri or Magha Bahula Chaturdashi is observed before the amavasya in the month of Magha.
- Narsimha Chaturdashi is observed on Shukla Paksha Chaturdashi of Vaisakha month.
- Ananta Chaturdashi is observed on the shukla paksha in the month of Bhadrapada.
- Vaikuntha Chaturdashi is observed on the chaturdashi of the month of Kartika.
- Holika Dahana is celebrated in the fourteenth day of the month of Phalguna.
