= Saptami =

Seventh day of the lunar fortnight in the Hindu calendar

Saptami (Sanskrit: सप्तमी, romanized: Saptamī) is the seventh day (tithi) of the fortnight (paksha) in the Hindu lunar calendar.

== Occasions ==
- Ratha Saptami: Surya is usually worshiped on this occasion. Usually, Rathasapthami begins in households with a purification bath by holding a few bilva leaves on one's head while bathing and chanting a verse that is supposed to invoke the benevolence of the deity in all that one takes up the rest of the year. It also involves doing a puja with the ritual 'Naivedyam', flowers and fruits.
- Navaratri: The seventh Day of the Navaratri Kalaratri Puja takes place.
- The birthday of Jalaram Bapa falls on Saptami Shukla paksha of Kartika and is celebrated as Jalaram Jayanti.
