= Panchami =

Fifth day of the lunar fortnight in the Hindu calendar

Panchami (Sanskrit: पञ्चमी, romanized: Pañcamī) is the fifth day (tithi) of the fortnight (paksha) in the Hindu lunar calendar.

== Festivals ==
- Naga Panchami is a Hindu festival celebrated by Hindus in most parts of India. It is celebrated in the Shravana month. On this day, adherents venerate snakes. Many offer milk and silver jewellery to cobras to protect them from all evils. They also engage in a fast. This festival is also celebrated to mark the legend of the deity Krishna defeating the serpent Kaliya. On this day, swings are put up in the village and people enjoy themselves. Married girls visit their parents during this occasion.
- Vasanta Panchami or Shri Panchami is a Hindu festival celebrating Saraswati, the goddess of knowledge, music, and art. It is celebrated every year on the fifth day of the Indian month Magha (January–February), the first day of spring. Traditionally during this festival children are taught to write their first words; Brahmins are fed; ancestor veneration (Pitr-tarpana) is performed; the god of love Kamadeva is worshipped; and most educational institutions organise special prayer for Saraswati. The colour yellow also plays an important role in this festival, in that people usually wear yellow garments, Saraswati is worshipped dressed in yellow, and yellow sweets are consumed within the families.
- Vivaha Panchami is a Hindu festival celebrating the occasion of the wedding of Rama and Sita. It is observed on the fifth day of the Shukla paksha or waxing phase of moon in the Margashirsha month (November – December) as per the Hindu calendar.
- Teej is a festival celebrated in India and Nepal that begins on Rishi Panchami.
