= Pratipada =

First day of the lunar fortnight in the Hindu calendar

Pratipada (Sanskrit: प्रतिपदा, romanized: Pratipadā) or Prathama (Sanskrit: प्रथमा, romanized: Prathamā) is the Sanskrit word for 'first', and is the first day in the lunar fortnight (Paksha) of the Hindu calendar. Each month has two Pratipada days, being the first day of the "bright" (Shukla) and of the "dark" (Krishna) fortnights respectively. Pratipada occurs on the first and the fifteenth day of each month.

== Occasions ==
- Gudi Padwa, the Marathi name for Chaitra Shukla Pratipada. It is celebrated on the first day of the Chaitra month to mark the beginning of the New Year according to the lunisolar Hindu calendar. This day is also the first day of Chaitra Navaratri and Ghatasthapana also known as Kalash Sthapana is done on this day.
- Govardhan Puja, a North Indian festival, occurs on Pratipada in the month of Kartika.
- Bali Pratipada, a South Indian and Maharashtrian festival, also occurs on Pratipada in the month of Kartika.
- Ugadi, the Kannada/Telugu name for Chaitra Shuddha Padyami. It is celebrated on the first day of the Chaitra month to mark the beginning of the New year according to the lunisolar Hindu Shalivahan Shaka calendar.

== See also ==
- Dvitiya – Second day of a lunar fortnight in the Hindu calendar
- Lunar phase (Hinduism) – Religious significance of lunar phases
