= Trayodashi =

Thirteenth day of the lunar fortnight of the Hindu calendar

Trayodashi is the Sanskrit word for "thirteen", and is the thirteenth day in the lunar fortnight (Paksha) of the Hindu calendar. Each month has two Trayodashi days, being the thirteenth day of the "bright" (Shukla) and of the "dark" (Krishna) fortnights respectively. Thus Trayodashi occurs on the thirteenth and the twenty-eighth day of each month.

== Festivals ==
- Dhanteras, also called Dhantrayodasi, is the first day of Diwali. It occurs on Trayodashi in the month of Ashvin.
- Mahavir Janma Kalyanak-According to Jain texts, Mahavira was born on the trayodashi of the bright half of the moon in the month of Chaitra in the year 599 BCE (Chaitra Sud 13).
