= Guru Purnima =

Hindu festival honouring the Guru

- Official name: Guru Purnima
- Observed by: Hindu, Sikhs devotees & Buddhist disciples in United States, Canada, Europe, Tibet, Bhutan, Kenya, India, Nepal and other parts of the world.
- Type: International, religious, cultural
- Significance: To express gratitude towards spiritual teachers
- Celebrations: Worship of Guru and temple visit
- Observances: Guru Puja
- Date: Ashadha Purnima
- 2025 date: 10 July (Thursday)
- Frequency: annual

Explanatory note on Hindu festival dates
- The Hindu calendar is lunisolar but most festival dates are specified using the lunar portion of the calendar. A lunar day is uniquely identified by three calendar elements: māsa (lunar month), pakṣa (lunar fortnight) and tithi (lunar day). Furthermore, when specifying the masa, one of two traditions are applicable, viz. amānta / pūrṇimānta. If a festival falls in the waning phase of the moon, these two traditions identify the same lunar day as falling in two different (but successive) masa. A lunar year is shorter than a solar year by about eleven days. As a result, most Hindu festivals occur on different days in successive years on the Gregorian calendar.

Guru Purnima (Sanskrit: गुरुपूर्णिमा, romanized: Gurupūrṇimā) is a religious festival dedicated to offering respect to spiritual and academic gurus. It is celebrated as a festival in India, Nepal and Bhutan by Hindus, Sikhs and Buddhists. It is observed on the full moon day (Purnima) in the month of Ashadha (June–July) according to the Hindu calendar. It is also known as Vyasa Purnima, because it marks the birthday of Veda Vyasa, the author of the Mahabharata and compiler of the Vedas.

== Etymology ==
The word guru is derived from the Sanskrit root words gu and ru. Gu means "darkness" or "ignorance", and ru means "dispeller." Therefore, a guru is the dispeller of darkness or ignorance.

== Observances ==
=== Hinduism ===
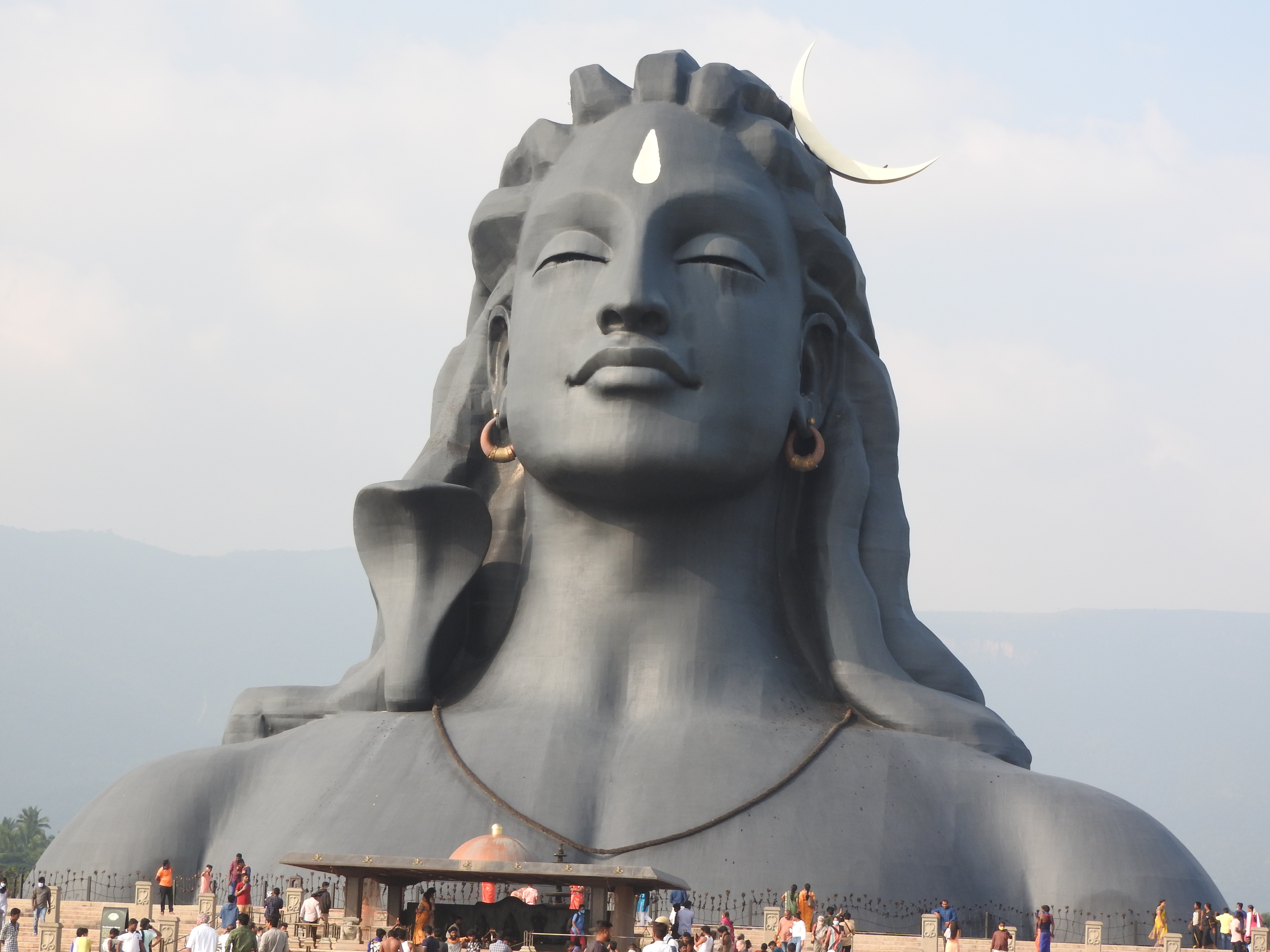
In the yogic tradition, Guru Purnima is the day when Shiva became the first guru

The celebration of Guru Purnima is marked by spiritual activities and may include Guru puja, a ritual held in honour of the guru or teacher. In addition to having religious importance, this festival has great importance for Indian academics and scholars. Indian academics celebrate this day by thanking their teachers as well as remembering past teachers and scholars. Hindu Gurus are revered on this day by remembering their life and teachings. The festivities are usually followed by a feast for the disciples, shishya, where the prasada and charnamrita (nectar of the feet), the symbolic washing of Guru's feet, which represents his kripa (grace) is distributed. Special recitations of the Hindu scriptures like the Guru Gita are held all day. Apart from the singing of bhajans, hymns and special kirtan session and havan at many places, where devotees from various regions gather at the ashrams, matha or place where the seat of Guru, Guru Gaddi exists. This day also sees the ritual of padapuja, the worship of Guru's sandals, which represent his holy feet and is seen as a way of rededicating to all that a Guru stands for. Disciples also recommit themselves on this day to following their teacher's guidance and teachings, for the coming year. In the Vedic Hindu tradition, the day is celebrated in honour of the sage Vyasa, who is seen as one of the greatest gurus in ancient Hindu traditions and a symbol of the guru-shishya tradition. These recitations are dedicated to him and are organised on this day, which is also known as Vyasa Purnima. Vyasa Puja is held at various temples, where floral offerings and symbolic gifts are offered in his honour. Hindu ascetics and wandering sanyasis observe this day by offering puja to their guru during Chaturmasya, a four-month period during the rainy season, when they choose seclusion and stay at one chosen place; some also give discourses to the local public.

=== Buddhism ===
The festival is celebrated by Buddhists in honour of the Buddha, who gave his first sermon on this day at Sarnath, Uttar Pradesh, India. In the yogic tradition, the day is celebrated as the occasion when Shiva became the first guru, as he began the transmission of Yoga to the Saptarishis. Buddhists observe uposatha, including the observance of the eight precepts on this day. Rainy season vassa also starts on this day, lasting for three lunar months, from July to October. During this time, Buddhist monks remain in a single place, generally in their temples. In some monasteries, monks dedicate the Vassa to intensive meditation. During Vassa, many Buddhist lay people reinvigorate their spiritual training and adopt more ascetic practices, such as giving up meat, alcohol, or smoking.

=== Nepal ===
In Nepal, Guru Purnima is a big day in schools. This day is teacher's day in Nepal. Students honour their teachers by offering delicacies, garlands, and special hats called topi made with indigenous fabric. Students often organize fanfares in schools to appreciate the hard work done by teachers. This is taken as a great opportunity to consolidate the bond of teacher-student relationships.

A sanyasi performing Vyasa puja traditionally held on Guru Purnima day, as a part of chaturmasya rituals

== Significance ==
=== Hindu ===
This was the day when Vyasa – author of the Mahabharata – was born to sage Parashara and a fisherman's daughter Satyavati; thus, this day is also celebrated as Vyasa Purnima. Veda Vyasa did yeoman service to the cause of Vedic studies by gathering all the Vedic hymns extant during his time and dividing them into four parts based on their characteristics and use in rites. He then taught them to his four chief disciples – Paila, Vaisampayana, Jaimini and Sumantu. This division and editing that earned him the honorific "Vyasa" (vyas = to edit, to divide). He divided the Vedas into four parts, namely, the Rigveda, Yajurveda, Samaveda and Atharvaveda.

=== Buddhism ===
Gautama Buddha went from Bodhgaya to Sarnath about 5 weeks after his enlightenment. Before he attained enlightenment, he gave up his austere penances. His former comrades, the pañcavargika, left him and went to Ṛṣipatana in Sarnath. After attaining Enlightenment, the Buddha left Uruvilvā and travelled to Ṛṣipatana to join and teach them. He went to them because he had foreseen, using his spiritual powers, that his five former companions would be able to understand the Dharma quickly. While travelling to Sarnath, Gautama Buddha had to cross the Ganges. When King Bimbisara heard of this, he abolished the toll for ascetics. When Gautama Buddha met his five former companions, he taught them the Dharmacakrapravartana Sūtra. They understood the teaching and also became enlightened. This marked the establishment of the mendicant Sangha, on the full-moon day of Asadha. The Buddha subsequently spent his first rainy season at Sarnath at the Mulagandhakuti. The bhikshu sangha soon grew to 60 members; then, Buddha sent them out in all directions to travel alone and teach Dharma.

=== Jainism ===
According to Jain traditions, special veneration is offered to gurus and teachers on Guru Purnima. The day falls at the beginning of Chaturmasya. On this day, Mahavira, after attaining kaivalya, made Gautama Swami his first disciple (ganadhara) thus becoming a Guru himself.

== See also ==
- Guru
