= Navami =

Ninth day of the lunar fortnight in the Hindu calendar

Navami (Sanskrit: नवमी, romanized: Navamī) is the Sanskrit word for "ninth", and is the ninth day in the lunar fortnight (Paksha) of the Hindu calendar. Each month has two Navami days, being the ninth day of the "bright" (Shukla) and of the "dark" (Krishna) fortnights respectively. Navami occurs on the ninth and the twenty-fourth day of each month.

== Festivals ==
- Rama Navami is a Hindu festival, celebrating of the birth of the deity Rama. It is celebrated on the navami of Shukla Paksha of the Chaitra month.
- Sita Navami is a Hindu festival, celebrating the birth of the goddess Sita. It is celebrated on the navami of the Shukla Paksha of the Vaishakha month.
- Swaminarayan Jayanti is a Hindu festival celebrating the birth of Swaminarayan. It is celebrated in Chaitra month on the ninth day which actually falls onto Rama Navami.
- Nandotsava is celebrated on Bhadrapada Krishna Navami, the day after the Krishna Janmashtami festival. It is celebrated to commemorate the celebrations of Krishna's foster-father Nanda after the birth of the deity.
- Maha Navami (Great Ninth Day) is part of Navaratri celebrations. Sharada Navaratri is the most important of the Navaratris, and is celebrated during the Sharada season (autumn). Ayudha Puja or Astra Puja is an integral part of the Vijayadashami festival, a Hindu festival traditionally celebrated in India.
- Akshaya Navami is celebrated on Kartika Shukla Navami (nine days after the Hindu festival Diwali). The day marks the date regarded to mark the beginning of the Satya Yuga, and hence is also called Satya Yugadi. On this day, amala (Indian gooseberry) trees are ritually worshipped as a manifestation of Vishnu, and hence this day is also known as Amala Navami.

The Hindu saint Sri Guru Raghavendra Swami was born on Phalguna Shukla Navami, when the moon was in Mrigashīrsha Nakshatra, in 1595 CE and advocated Madhvacharya's Dvaita philosophy.
