= Dashami =

Tenth day of the lunar fortnight in the Hindu calendar

Dashami (Sanskrit: दशमी, romanized: Daśamī) is the Sanskrit word for "tenth", and is the tenth day in the lunar fortnight (Paksha) of the Hindu calendar. Each month has two Dashami days, being the tenth day of the "bright" (Shukla) and of the "dark" (Krishna) fortnights respectively. Dashami occurs on the tenth and the twenty-fifth day of each month.

== Occasions ==
The Hindu observance of Vijayadashami, celebrated during the festival of Navarati, falls on a dashami.
