= Thinla (month) =

Second month of the Newa calendar

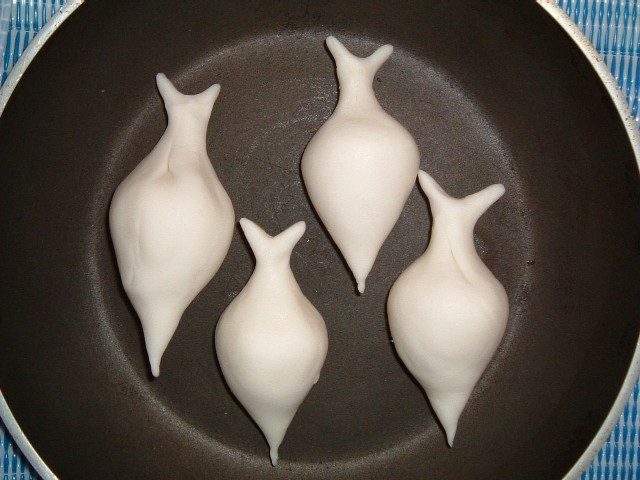
Yomari confection

Thinlā (Nepal Bhasa: थिंला) is the second month in the Nepal Era calendar, the national lunar calendar of Nepal. The month corresponds to Margashirsha (मार्गशीर्ष) in the Hindu lunar calendar and roughly overlaps with December in the Gregorian calendar.

Thinlā begins with the new moon and the full moon falls on the 15th of the lunar month. The month is divided into the bright and dark fortnights which are known as Thinlā Thwa (थिंला थ्व) and Thinlā Gā (थिंला गा) respectively.

The main event during this month is the Hindu festival of Vaikuntha Ekadashi which is dedicated to Vishnu. It falls on the 11th day of the bright fortnight. The full moon is also a major religious holiday. In Nepal Mandala, the day is celebrated as Yomari Punhi (यःमरि पुन्हि). The festival celebrates the harvest. The special food of the day is a confection known as Yomari, a dumpling made of rice-flour dough filled with a paste of molasses and sesame seeds. In other cultures, the day is known as Dhānya Purnimā.

== Days in the month ==
Thwa (थ्व) or Shukla Paksha (bright half)	Gā (गा) or Krishna Paksha (dark half)
1. Pāru	1. Pāru
2. Dwitiyā	2. Dwitiyā
3. Tritiyā	3. Tritiyā
4. Chauthi	4. Chauthi
5. Panchami	5. Panchami
6. Khasti	6. Khasti
7. Saptami	7. Saptami
8. Ashtami	8. Ashtami
9. Navami	9. Navami
10. Dashami	10. Dashami
11. Ekādashi	11. Ekādashi
12. Dwādashi	12. Dwādashi
13. Trayodashi	13. Trayodashi
14. Chaturdashi	14. Charhe (चह्रे)
15. Punhi (पुन्हि)	15. Āmāi (आमाइ)

== Months of the year ==
Devanagari script	Roman script	Corresponding Gregorian month	Name of Full Moon
1. कछला	Kachhalā	November	Saki Milā Punhi, Kārtik Purnimā
2. थिंला	Thinlā	December	Yomari Punhi, Dhānya Purnimā
3. पोहेला	Pohelā	January	Milā Punhi, Paush Purnimā
4. सिल्ला	Sillā	February	Si Punhi, Māghi Purnimā
5. चिल्ला	Chillā	March	Holi Punhi, Phāgu Purnimā
6. चौला	Chaulā	April	Lhuti Punhi, Bālāju Purnimā
7. बछला	Bachhalā	May	Swānyā Punhi, Baisākh Purnimā
8. तछला	Tachhalā	June	Jyā Punhi, Gaidu Purnimā
9. दिल्ला	Dillā	July	Dillā Punhi, Guru Purnimā
10. गुंला	Gunlā	August	Gun Punhi, Janāi Purnimā (Raksha Bandhan)
11. ञला	Yanlā	September	Yenyā Punhi, Bhādra Purnimā
12. कौला	Kaulā	October	Katin Punhi, Kojāgrat Purnimā
