= Kachhala (month) =

First month of the Newa calendar

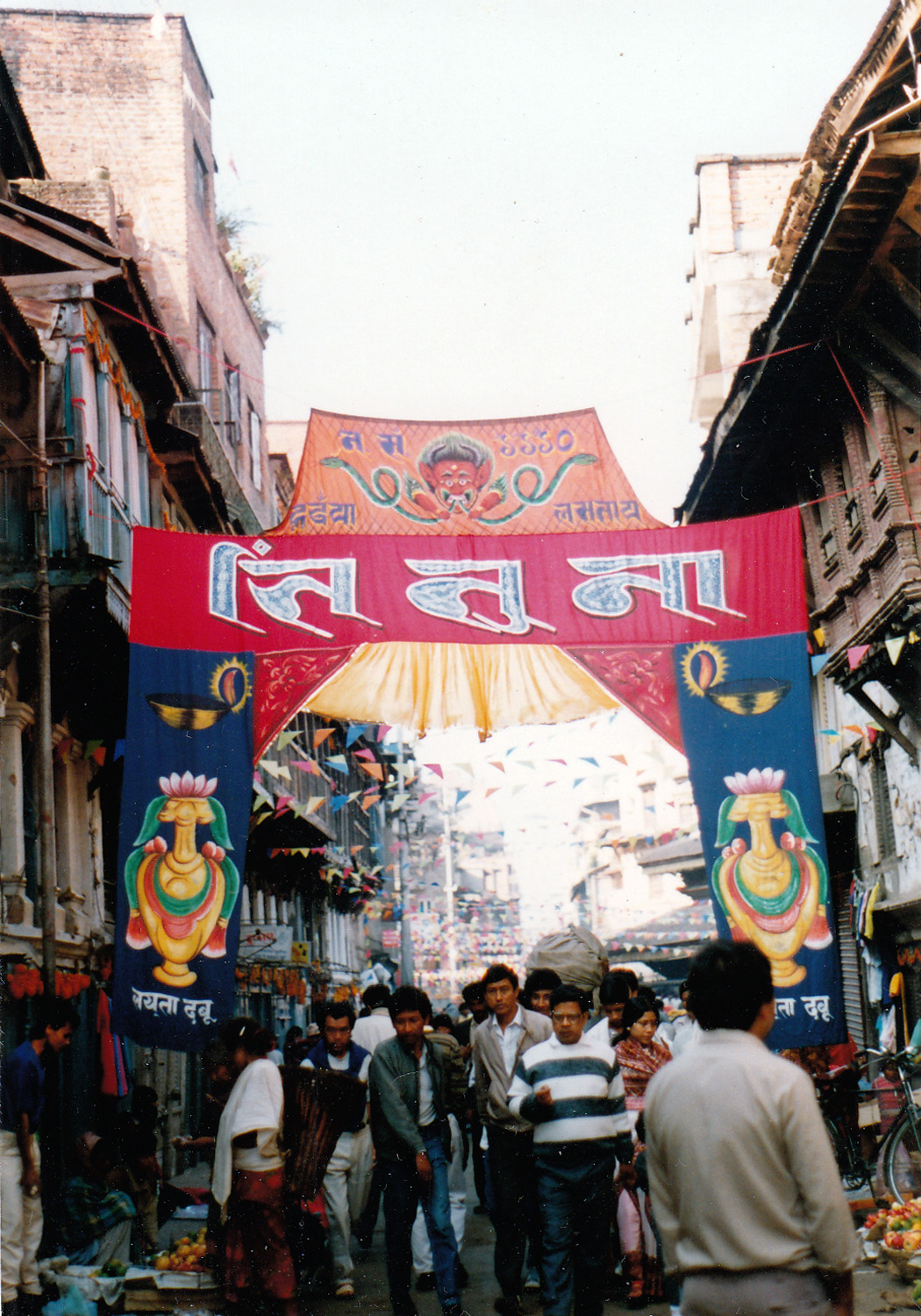
New Year's Day bunting in Kathmandu.

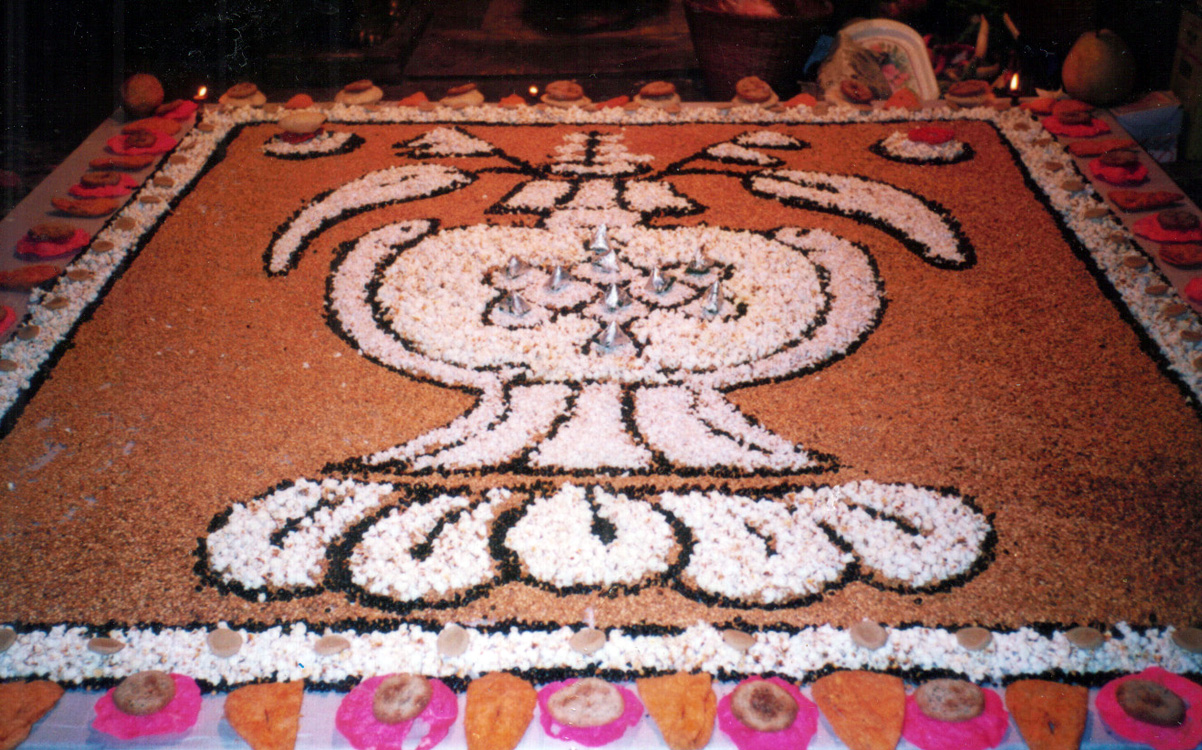
Halimali display, grain art showing auspicious jar on Kārtik Purnimā.

Kachhalā (Nepal Bhasa: कछला) is the first month in the Nepal Era calendar, the national lunar calendar of Nepal. The month corresponds to Kārtik in the Hindu lunar calendar and roughly aligns with November in the Gregorian calendar.

Kachhalā begins with the new moon and the full moon falls on the 15th of the lunar month. The month is divided into the bright and dark fortnights which are known as Kachhalā Thwa (कछला थ्व) and Kachhalā Gā (कछला गा) respectively.

The most important festival that occurs during this month is Tihar (Swanti). The first day of the bright fortnight of Kachhalā is New Year's Day when Newars observe Mha Puja, an auspicious ceremony to invoke good fortune during the coming year.

The full moon Kārtik Purnimā is also a major religious holiday. In Nepal Mandala, the day is celebrated as Saki Milā Punhi (सकि मिला पुन्हि) or Saki Manā Punhi (सकि मना पुन्हि). Sacred paintings known as Halimali, which are made of popcorn, wheat and black soybeans, are displayed in front of temples to mark the end of the month-long hymn singing season. The special food of the day is boiled arum and sweet potato.

== Days in the month ==
Thwa (थ्व) or Shukla Paksha (bright half)	Gā (गा) or Krishna Paksha (dark half)
1. Pāru	1. Pāru
2. Dwitiyā	2. Dwitiyā
3. Tritiyā	3. Tritiyā
4. Chauthi	4. Chauthi
5. Panchami	5. Panchami
6. Khasti	6. Khasti
7. Saptami	7. Saptami
8. Ashtami	8. Ashtami
9. Navami	9. Navami
10. Dashami	10. Dashami
11. Ekādashi	11. Ekādashi
12. Dwādashi	12. Dwādashi
13. Trayodashi	13. Trayodashi
14. Chaturdashi	14. Charhe (चह्रे)
15. Punhi (पुन्हि)	15. Āmāi (आमाइ)

== Months of the year ==
Devanagari script	Roman script	Corresponding Gregorian month	Name of Full Moon
1. कछला	Kachhalā	November	Saki Milā Punhi, Kārtik Purnimā
2. थिंला	Thinlā	December	Yomari Punhi, Dhānya Purnimā
3. पोहेला	Pohelā	January	Milā Punhi, Paush Purnimā
4. सिल्ला	Sillā	February	Si Punhi, Māghi Purnimā
5. चिल्ला	Chillā	March	Holi Punhi, Phāgu Purnimā
6. चौला	Chaulā	April	Lhuti Punhi, Bālāju Purnimā
7. बछला	Bachhalā	May	Swānyā Punhi, Baisākh Purnimā
8. तछला	Tachhalā	June	Jyā Punhi, Gaidu Purnimā
9. दिल्ला	Dillā	July	Dillā Punhi, Guru Purnimā
10. गुंला	Gunlā	August	Gun Punhi, Janāi Purnimā (Raksha Bandhan)
11. ञला	Yanlā	September	Yenyā Punhi, Bhādra Purnimā
12. कौला	Kaulā	October	Katin Punhi, Kojāgrat Purnimā
