= Sila (month) =

Pashupatinath Temple in Kathmandu where a fair is held on Maha Shivaratri.

Silā (Nepal Bhasa: 𑐳𑐶𑐮𑐵, सिला) is the fourth month in the Nepal Era calendar, the national lunar calendar of Nepal. The month corresponds to Magha (माघ) in the Hindu lunar calendar and roughly aligns with February in the Gregorian calendar.

Silā begins with the new moon and the full moon falls on the 15th of the lunar month. The month is divided into the bright and dark fortnights which are known as Silā Thwa (सिला थ्व) and Silā Gā (सिला गा) respectively.

The most important festivals during the month are Shree Panchami which falls on the fifth day of the bright fortnight and Maha Shivaratri (Nepal Bhasa: सिला चह्रे Silā Charhe) on the 14th day of the dark fortnight. Shree Panchami is the first day of spring while Shivaratri honors the Hindu deity Shiva. On the full moon day, the month-long Swasthani sacred story reciting festival ends.

== Days in the month ==
| Thwa (थ्व) or Shukla Paksha (bright half) | Gā (गा) or Krishna Paksha (dark half) |
|---|---|
| 1. Pāru | 1. Pāru |
| 2. Dwitiyā | 2. Dwitiyā |
| 3. Tritiyā | 3. Tritiyā |
| 4. Chauthi | 4. Chauthi |
| 5. Panchami | 5. Panchami |
| 6. Khasti | 6. Khasti |
| 7. Saptami | 7. Saptami |
| 8. Ashtami | 8. Ashtami |
| 9. Navami | 9. Navami |
| 10. Dashami | 10. Dashami |
| 11. Ekādashi | 11. Ekādashi |
| 12. Dwādashi | 12. Dwādashi |
| 13. Trayodashi | 13. Trayodashi |
| 14. Chaturdashi | 14. Charhe (चह्रे) |
| 15. Punhi (पुन्हि) | 15. Āmāi (आमाइ) |

== Months of the year ==
| Devanagari script | Roman script | Corresponding Gregorian month | Name of Full Moon |
|---|---|---|---|
| 1. कछला | Kachhalā | November | Saki Milā Punhi, Kārtik Purnimā |
| 2. थिंला | Thinlā | December | Yomari Punhi, Dhānya Purnimā |
| 3. पोहेला | Pohelā | January | Milā Punhi, Paush Purnimā |
| 4. सिल्ला | Silā | February | Si Punhi, Māghi Purnimā |
| 5. चिल्ला | Chillā | March | Holi Punhi, Phāgu Purnimā |
| 6. चौला | Chaulā | April | Lhuti Punhi, Bālāju Purnimā |
| 7. बछला | Bachhalā | May | Swānyā Punhi, Baisākh Purnimā |
| 8. तछला | Tachhalā | June | Jyā Punhi, Gaidu Purnimā |
| 9. दिल्ला | Dillā | July | Dillā Punhi, Guru Purnimā |
| 10. गुंला | Gunlā | August | Gun Punhi, Janāi Purnimā (Raksha Bandhan) |
| 11. ञला | Yanlā | September | Yenyā Punhi, Bhādra Purnimā |
| 12. कौला | Kaulā | October | Katin Punhi, Kojāgrat Purnimā |
