= Indra Chowk =

Market square in Kathmandu

Coordinates: 27°42′22″N 85°18′35″E

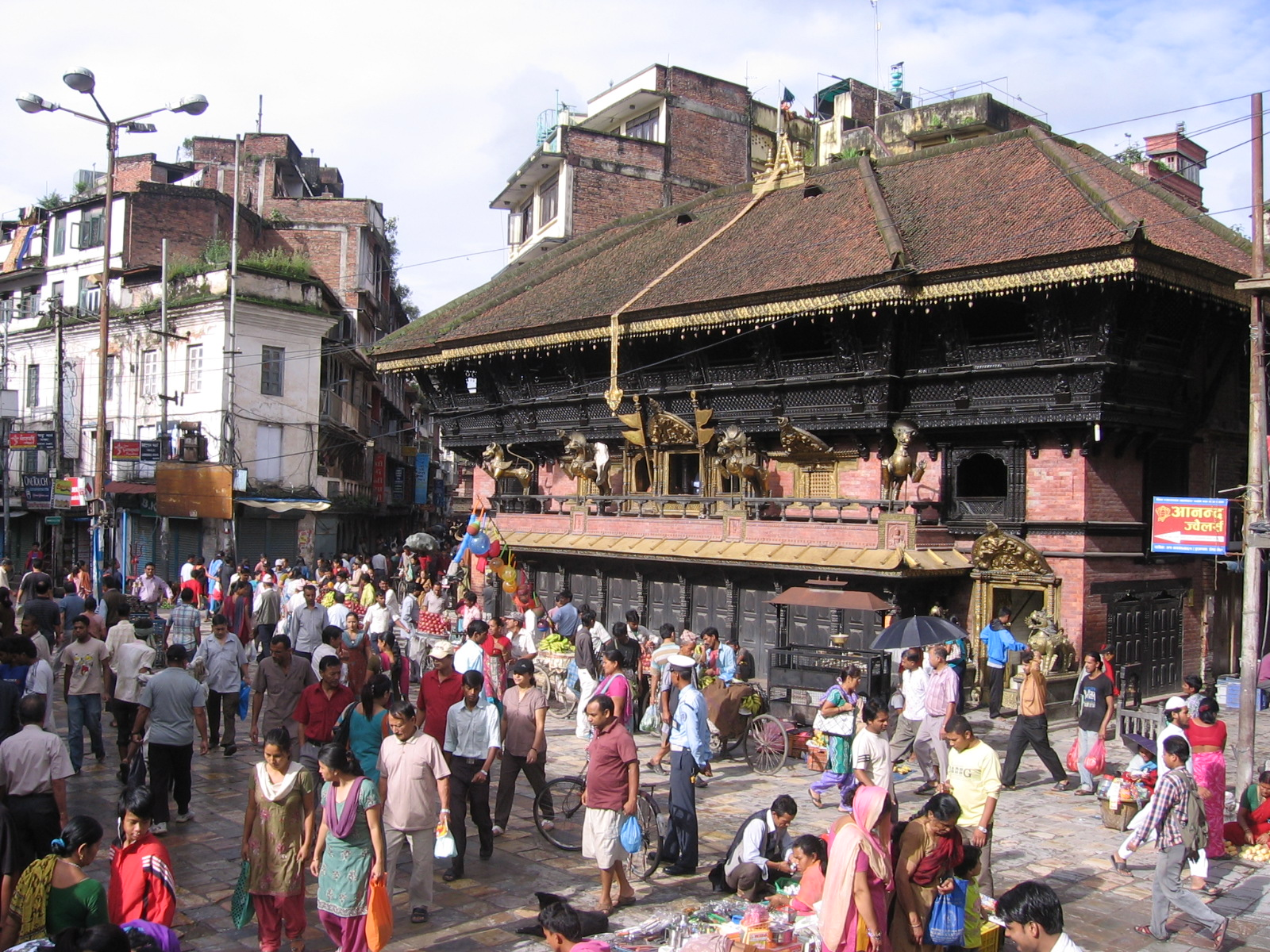
Temple of Akash Bhairav, Indra Chowk

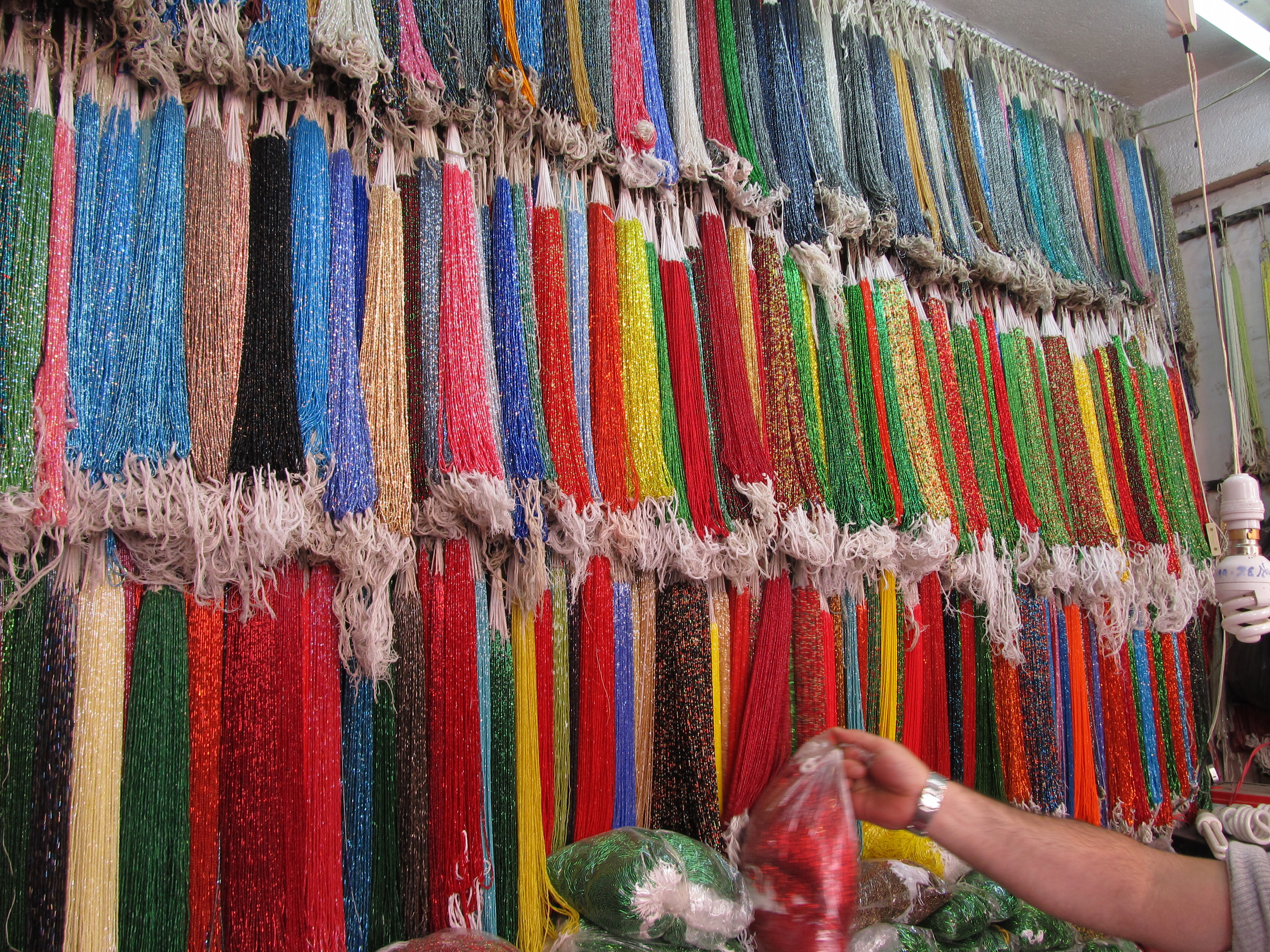
Beads bazaar

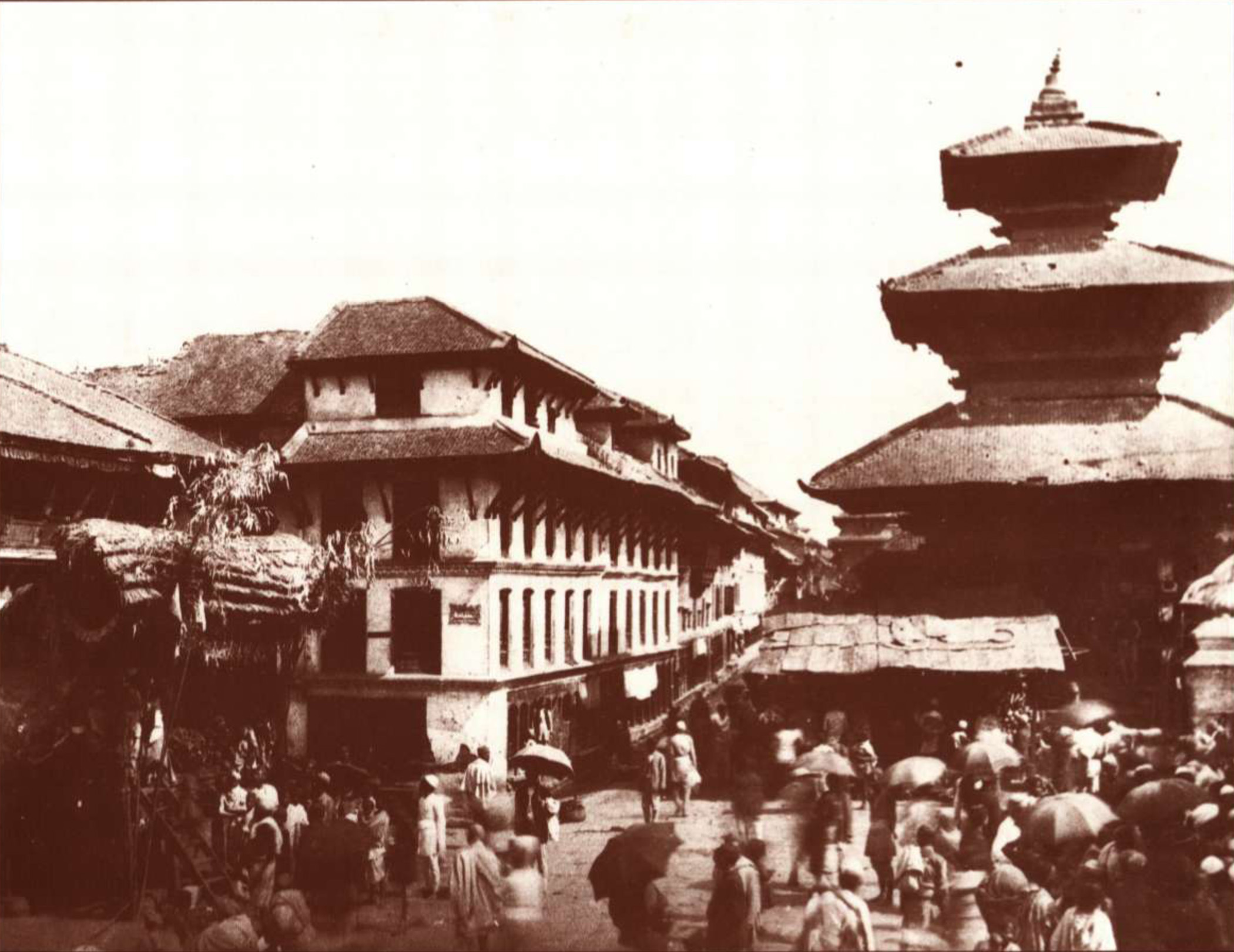
North side of Indra Chowk in 1910

Indra Chowk (Nepali: इन्द्रचोक; pronounced [indra t͡sok]) or Wongha: (Newari) is one of the ceremonial and market squares on the artery passing through the historic section of Kathmandu, Nepal. The intersection of Indra Chowk, along with Maru, Kathmandu Durbar Square, Makhan, Jana Baha, Asan and Naxal, mark the old India-Tibet trade route that is now a vibrant market street.

Six streets meet at Indra Chowk and link the square to Kathmandu's major localities. Its temples and bazaar draw streams of pilgrims and shoppers. The square is named after Indra, lord of heaven in Hindu mythology.

Indra Chowk is a ceremonial venue and major festival pageants and chariot processions pass through the square. During Indra Jatra, the chariots of Kumari, Ganesh and Bhairav are pulled through here. The chariot procession of Jana Baha Dyah Jatra also passes through the square.

== Highlights ==
- The large temple of Akash Bhairav (alternative name: Āju Dyah आजुद्यः) on the western side of the square is the symbol of Indra Chowk. The temple houses a large mask of Akash Bhairav, which means "god of the sky", up a flight of stairs. The ground floor contains shops.
- A Shiva Temple stands on the northern side of the square. The original pagoda structure was completely destroyed during the 1934 Nepal–Bihar earthquake, and it has been replaced by a small domed shrine.
- Raki Bazaar, a twisting alley lined with small shops selling glass beads, is situated on the eastern side of the square. The ancestors of the merchants here are believed to have come from Iraq during the medieval period, and the name Raki Bazaar derived from the term Iraqi.
- Shukra Path is the wide road leading south from the square to New Road. It is lined with identical white-washed stucco houses and was built after the 1934 earthquake. Named after martyr Shukra Raj Shastri, it is a fancy shopping street and a Kathmandu landmark.
- A small temple of Ganesh (alternative name Ganedya गनेद्य:) stands at the southwestern corner of the square. The street leads to Makhan and Durbar Square.
