= Chaula (month) =

Sixth month of the Newa calendar

Chaulā (Nepal Bhasa: चौला) is the sixth month in the Nepal Era calendar, the national lunar calendar of Nepal. The month coincides with Chaitra (चैत्र) in the Hindu lunar calendar and typically spans from mid-March to mid-April in the Gregorian calendar.

Chaulā begins with the new moon and the full moon falls on the 15th of the lunar month. The month is divided into the bright and dark fortnights which are known as Chaulā Thaw (चौला थ्व) and Chaulā Gā (चौला गा) respectively.

One of the major events that occur during this month is Jana Baha Dyah Jatra, the chariot festival of the Buddhist deity White Machhendranath, the Bodhisattva of compassion. It begins on the 8th day of the bright fortnight and ends on the 10th day.

The Hindu festival of Chaitra Dasain also falls on the 8th day of the bright fortnight. It is a smaller version of the Dasain festival. The 9th day is Rama Navami which celebrates the birth of the Hindu deity Rama.

The full moon day is known as Bālāju Purnimā or Lhuti Punhi. In Kathmandu, people celebrate the holiday by bathing at the stone water spouts of Balaju and climbing the nearby sacred hilltop of Jamacho. The 15th day of the dark fortnight is Nepalese Mother's Day, known as Mātā Tirtha Aunsi ("Mother Pilgrimage New Moon") or Māmyā Khwā Swayegu ("Looking upon Mother's Face").

== Days in the month ==
Thaw (थ्व) or Shukla Paksha (bright half)	Gā (गा) or Krishna Paksha (dark half)
1. Pāru	1. Pāru
2. Dwitiyā	2. Dwitiyā
3. Tritiyā	3. Tritiyā
4. Chauthi	4. Chauthi
5. Panchami	5. Panchami
6. Khasti	6. Khasti
7. Saptami	7. Saptami
8. Ashtami	8. Ashtami
9. Navami	9. Navami
10. Dashami	10. Dashami
11. Ekādashi	11. Ekādashi
12. Dwādashi	12. Dwādashi
13. Trayodashi	13. Trayodashi
14. Chaturdashi	14. Charhe (चह्रे)
15. Punhi (पुन्हि)	15. Āmāi (आमाइ)

== Months of the year ==
Devanagari script	Roman script	Corresponding Gregorian month	Name of Full Moon
1. कछला	Kachhalā	November	Saki Milā Punhi, Kārtik Purnimā
2. थिंला	Thinlā	December	Yomari Punhi, Dhānya Purnimā
3. पोहेला	Pohelā	January	Milā Punhi, Paush Purnimā
4. सिल्ला	Sillā	February	Si Punhi, Māghi Purnimā
5. चिल्ला	Chillā	March	Holi Punhi, Phāgu Purnimā
6. चौला	Chaulā	April	Lhuti Punhi, Bālāju Purnimā
7. बछला	Bachhalā	May	Swānyā Punhi, Baisākh Purnimā
8. तछला	Tachhalā	June	Jyā Punhi, Gaidu Purnimā
9. दिल्ला	Dillā	July	Dillā Punhi, Guru Purnimā
10. गुंला	Gunlā	August	Gun Punhi, Janāi Purnimā (Raksha Bandhan)
11. ञला	Yanlā	September	Yenyā Punhi, Bhādra Purnimā
12. कौला	Kaulā	October	Katin Punhi, Kojāgrat Purnimā
