= Bachhala (month) =

Seventh month of the Newa calendar

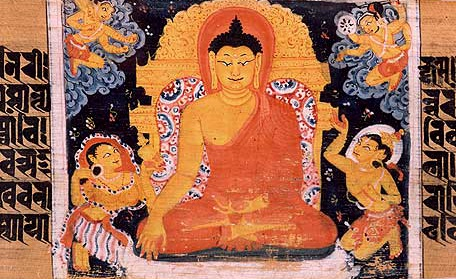
Baisākh Purnimā marks Buddha's birth, enlightenment and Nirvana.

Bachhalā (Nepal Bhasa: बछला) is the seventh month in the Nepal Era calendar, the national lunar calendar of Nepal. The month coincides with Vaisakha (वैसाख) in the Hindu lunar calendar and roughly aligns with May in the Gregorian calendar.

Bachhalā begins with the new moon and the full moon falls on the 15th of the lunar month. The month is divided into the bright and dark fortnights which are known as Bachhalā Thaw (बछला थ्व) and Bachhalā Gā (बछला गा) respectively.

Among the most important festivals of the month, Bunga Dyah Jatra, the chariot pulling festival of the Buddhist deity Red Avalokiteśvara, begins at Patan on the 4th day of the bright fortnight.

The full moon day of Baisākh Purnimā (वैसाख पुर्णिमा) is one of the year's most widely celebrated holidays. It is known as Swānyā Punhi (स्वांया पुन्हि) in Nepal Bhasa and means "Full Moon Day of Flowers". The holiday celebrates three events in the Buddha's life—his birth, enlightenment and Nirvana.

== Days in the month ==
| Thaw (थ्व) or Shukla Paksha (bright half) | Gā (गा) or Krishna Paksha (dark half) |
|---|---|
| 1. Pāru | 1. Pāru |
| 2. Dwitiyā | 2. Dwitiyā |
| 3. Tritiyā | 3. Tritiyā |
| 4. Chauthi | 4. Chauthi |
| 5. Panchami | 5. Panchami |
| 6. Khasti | 6. Khasti |
| 7. Saptami | 7. Saptami |
| 8. Ashtami | 8. Ashtami |
| 9. Navami | 9. Navami |
| 10. Dashami | 10. Dashami |
| 11. Ekādashi | 11. Ekādashi |
| 12. Dwādashi | 12. Dwādashi |
| 13. Trayodashi | 13. Trayodashi |
| 14. Chaturdashi | 14. Charhe (चह्रे) |
| 15. Punhi (पुन्हि) | 15. Āmāi (आमाइ) |

== Months of the year ==
| Devanagari script | Roman script | Corresponding Gregorian month | Name of Full Moon |
|---|---|---|---|
| 1. कछला | Kachhalā | November | Saki Milā Punhi, Kārtik Purnimā |
| 2. थिंला | Thinlā | December | Yomari Punhi, Dhānya Purnimā |
| 3. पोहेला | Pohelā | January | Milā Punhi, Paush Purnimā |
| 4. सिल्ला | Sillā | February | Si Punhi, Māghi Purnimā |
| 5. चिल्ला | Chillā | March | Holi Punhi, Phāgu Purnimā |
| 6. चौला | Chaulā | April | Lhuti Punhi, Bālāju Purnimā |
| 7. बछला | Bachhalā | May | Swānyā Punhi, Baisākh Purnimā |
| 8. तछला | Tachhalā | June | Jyā Punhi, Gaidu Purnimā |
| 9. दिल्ला | Dillā | July | Dillā Punhi, Guru Purnimā |
| 10. गुंला | Gunlā | August | Gun Punhi, Janāi Purnimā (Raksha Bandhan) |
| 11. ञला | Yanlā | September | Yenyā Punhi, Bhādra Purnimā |
| 12. कौला | Kaulā | October | Katin Punhi, Kojāgrat Purnimā |
