= Yanla (month) =

Eleventh month in the Nepal Era calendar

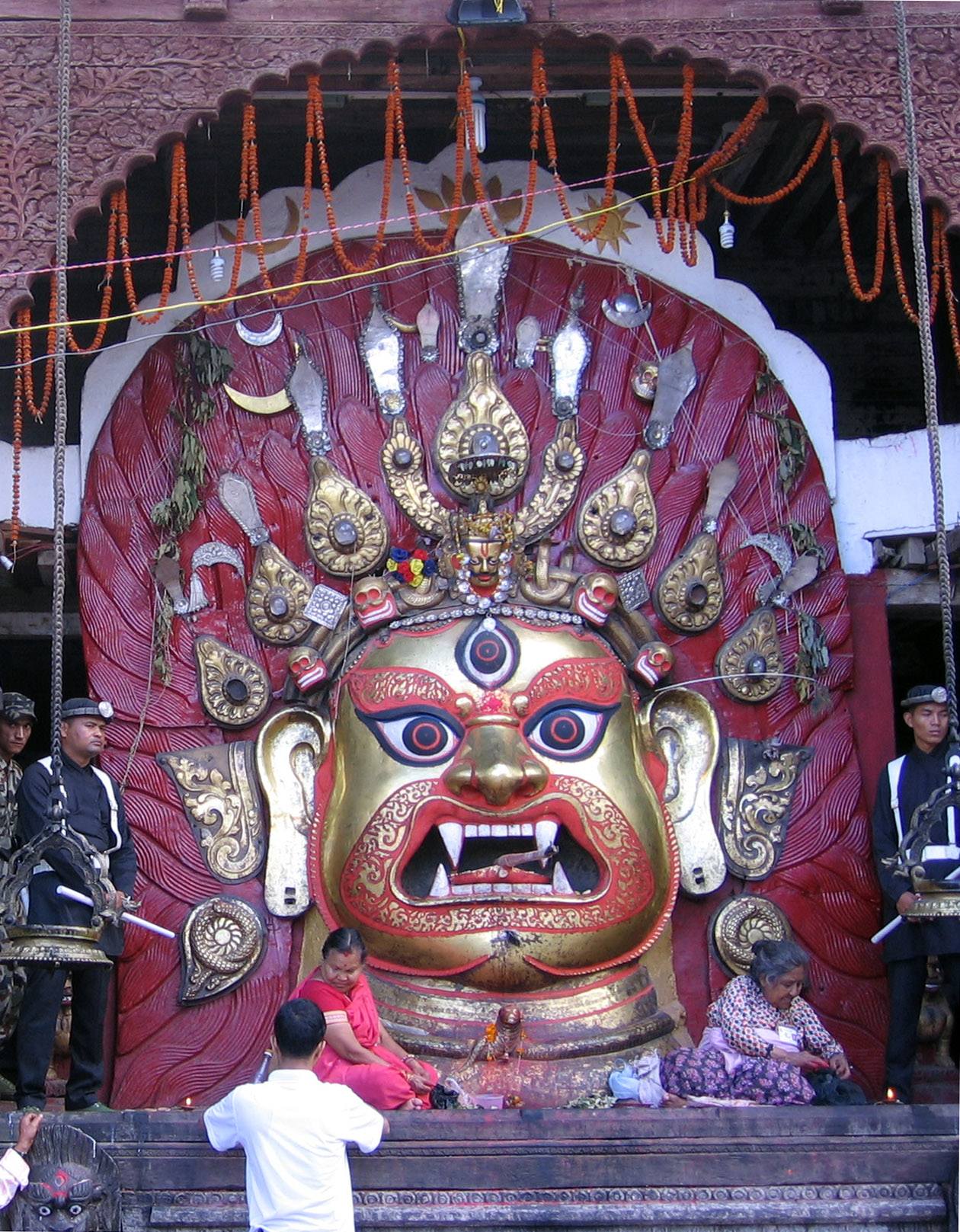
The great mask of Sweta Bhairava is revealed during the Yenyā festival.

Yanlā (Nepal Bhasa: ञला) is the eleventh month in the Nepal Era calendar, the national lunar calendar of Nepal. The month coincides with Bhadrapada (भाद्रपद) in the Hindu lunar calendar and roughly aligns with September in the Gregorian calendar.

Yanlā begins with the new moon and the full moon falls on the 15th of the lunar month. The month is divided into the bright and dark fortnights which are known as Yanlā Thwa (ञला थ्व) and Yanlā Gā (ञला गा) respectively.

Among the major events of the month, the 4th day of the bright fortnight is Ganesha Chaturthi which marks the birthday of the Hindu deity of good fortune Ganesha. It is known as Chathā (चथा) in Nepal Bhasa.

The highlight of Yanlā is Yenyā (येँयाः). The name means "Festival of Kathmandu" and it is the largest religious street celebration in the Nepalese capital. Also known as Indra Jātrā, it consists of chariot processions of the Living Goddess Kumari, masked dances of deities, pageants and displays of sacred images. Yenyā lasts for eight days from the 12th day of the bright fortnight to the 4th day of the dark fortnight.

== Days in the month ==
Thwa (थ्व) or Shukla Paksha (bright half)	Gā (गा) or Krishna Paksha (dark half)
1. Pāru	1. Pāru
2. Dwitiyā	2. Dwitiyā
3. Tritiyā	3. Tritiyā
4. Chauthi	4. Chauthi
5. Panchami	5. Panchami
6. Khasti	6. Khasti
7. Saptami	7. Saptami
8. Ashtami	8. Ashtami
9. Navami	9. Navami
10. Dashami	10. Dashami
11. Ekādashi	11. Ekādashi
12. Dwādashi	12. Dwādashi
13. Trayodashi	13. Trayodashi
14. Chaturdashi	14. Charhe (चह्रे)
15. Punhi (पुन्हि)	15. Āmāi (आमाइ)

== Months of the year ==
Devanagari script	Roman script	Corresponding Gregorian month	Name of Full Moon
1. कछला	Kachhalā	November	Saki Milā Punhi, Kārtik Purnimā
2. थिंला	Thinlā	December	Yomari Punhi, Dhānya Purnimā
3. पोहेला	Pohelā	January	Milā Punhi, Paush Purnimā
4. सिल्ला	Sillā	February	Si Punhi, Māghi Purnimā
5. चिल्ला	Chillā	March	Holi Punhi, Phāgu Purnimā
6. चौला	Chaulā	April	Lhuti Punhi, Bālāju Purnimā
7. बछला	Bachhalā	May	Swānyā Punhi, Baisākh Purnimā
8. तछला	Tachhalā	June	Jyā Punhi, Gaidu Purnimā
9. दिल्ला	Dillā	July	Dillā Punhi, Guru Purnimā
10. गुंला	Gunlā	August	Gun Punhi, Janāi Purnimā (Raksha Bandhan)
11. ञला	Yanlā	September	Yenyā Punhi, Bhādra Purnimā
12. कौला	Kaulā	October	Katin Punhi, Kojāgrat Purnimā
