= Swet Bhairav =

Statue of Bhairava, avatar of Shiva

Swet Bhairab, Kathmandu Durabar Square

Sweta Bhairav

Swet Bhairav is a statue of Bhairava, avatar of Shiva located in Hanuman Dhoka, Kathmandu Durbar Square, Nepal. Swet Bhairav depicts the most dangerous and fierce face of Shiva. The mask of Swet Bhairab is so fierce looking that locals out of fear keep it inside a wooden frame window, and only one frame is opened for the devotees except for a special day: Indra Jatra when all the windows are opened. In the very day of Indra Jatra a wooden/ bamboo straw is placed in the mouth of the statue and rice liquor is siphoned as a prasad for the devotees. The alcohol if consumed is believed to bring good health and fortune via the blessings of Swet Bhairav.

Inside the wooden latticed screen, below Dega Taleju is hidden the terrifying face of Swet Bhairav. The giant sculpture was fashioned and installed in 1795, during the rule of Rana Bahadur Shah.
