= Khyah (legendary creature) =

Newari mythical creature

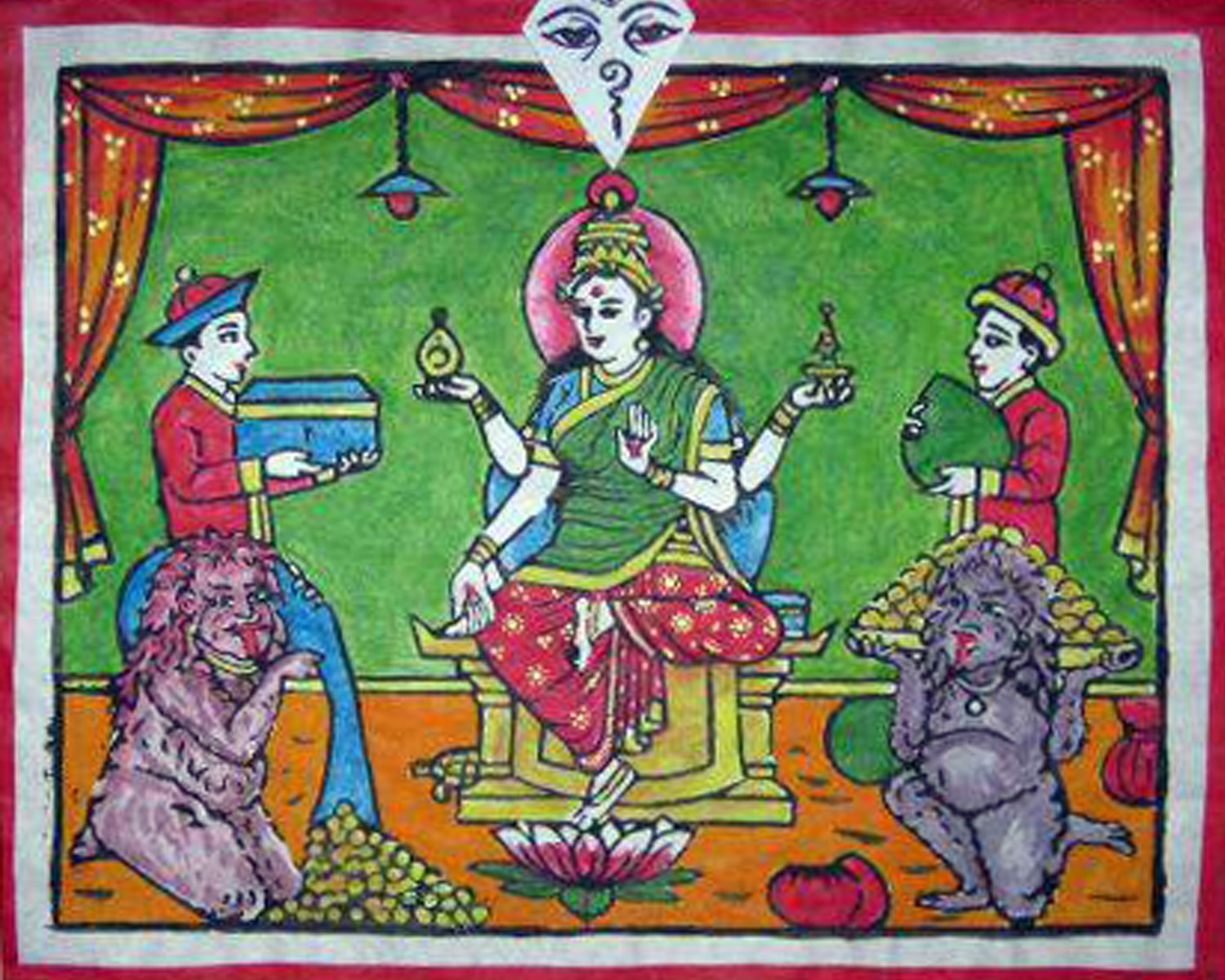
Painting showing Hindu deity Lakshmi and a pair of Khyahs (foreground).

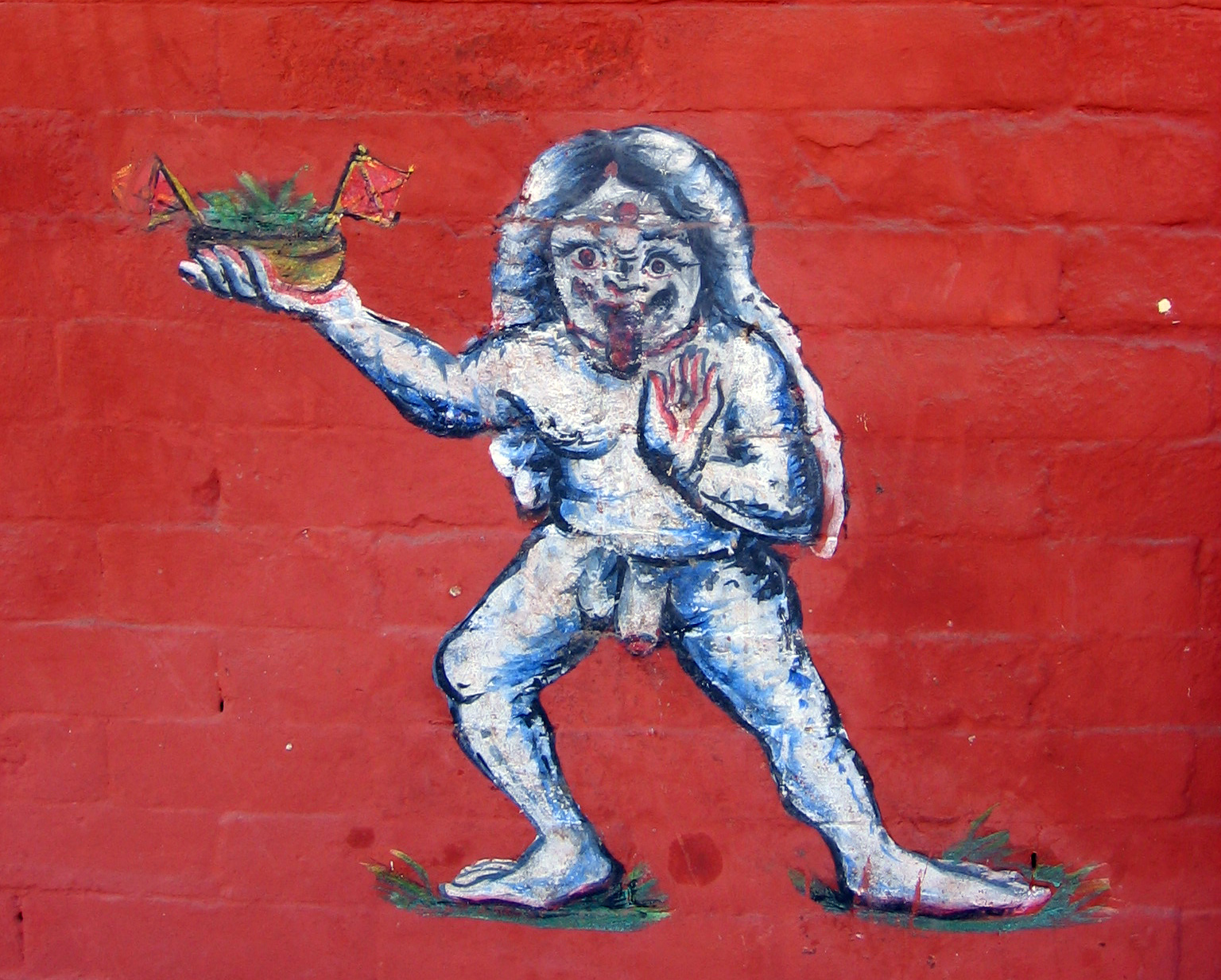
Painting of a Khyah in a temple in Kathmandu.

Khyāh (Newar: 𑐏𑑂𑐫𑐵𑑅; alternative spellings Khyā or Khyāk) (Note: Newar: 𑐏𑑂𑐫𑐵𑐎𑑂, romanized: Khyāk) is a mythical humanoid creature in Newari folklore. It is depicted as a fat, hairy and short ape-like creature.

Khyahs appear in children's stories popular in Newar society. A friendly Khyah fills the home with goodness while bad ones bring trouble. A white Khyah is believed to bring good luck while a black one can create problems. Encountering a Khyah can make one ill. Khyahs are said to tickle their victims to death.

In Newar culture, Khyahs attend to Lakshmi, the goddess of wealth, and pictures of the deity show them guarding overflowing bags of coins. Household Khyahs usually dwell in the attic and dark storerooms. They are said to fear electric lighting.

The antithesis of the Khyah is the Kawanchā, a skeleton. Khyahs and Kawanchas appear as supporting characters in sacred dance dramas of the Newars. Images of Khyahs and Kawanchas are also placed at temples as guardians of the shrine.

== Khyah dance ==
During the Yenya festival in Kathmandu, dance performances are held at market squares and the Durbar Square where actors dressed in Khyah costumes give dance performances. The dances, known as Khyāh Pyākhan (ख्याः प्याखं), consist of antics and tumbling.

== Types of Khyah ==
- Bārāy Khyāh (बाराय् ख्याः) appears in rooms where girls are kept in seclusion during their rite of passage.
- Bhakun Gwārā Khyāh (भकुं ग्वारा ख्याः), literally football, rolls on the ground to move around.
- Dhāpalān Khyāh (धापलां ख्याः) is a very hairy Khyah.
- Lanpan Khyāh (लँपं ख्याः) blocks people's way on dark streets.
- Bun Khyāh (बुँ ख्याः) is the one who lives in a crop field

== In popular culture ==
This is a traditional children's song in Newar about Dhāpalān Khyāh used in a singing game:

Kune su wala?
Dhāpalān Khyāh.
Chhu yāh wala?
Bhoy nah wala.
Chhu bhoy?
Lākhāmari bhoy.
Lākhāmari sāā lā?
sāā sāā.
Ulin gāh lā?
Magāh.

कुने सु वल ?
धापलां ख्या:
छु या: वल ?
भोय् न: वल
छु भोय् ?
लाखामरि भोय्
लाखामरि सा: ला ?
सा: सा:
उलिं गा: ला ?
मगा:

Who's there downstairs?
Dhāpalān Khyāh (A hairy elf).
What has he come for?
To eat a feast.
What feast?
A sugar cookie feast.
Is the cookie delicious?
Yes yes
Is that enough?
Not enough.
