= Maru, Kathmandu =

Neighbourhood in Kathmandu, Nepal

Coordinates: 27.7036°N 85.3056°E

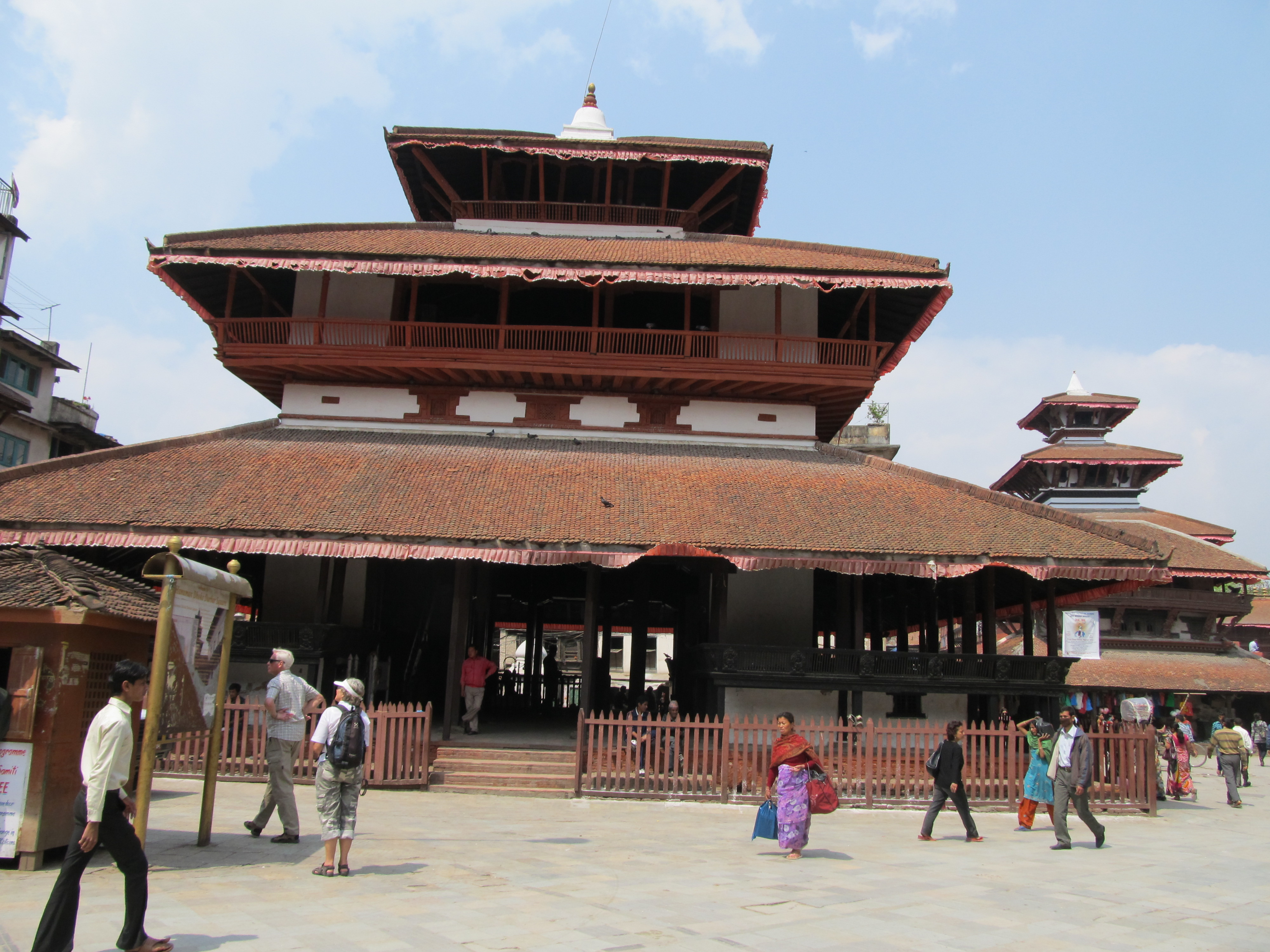
Maru Satah (Kasthamandap)

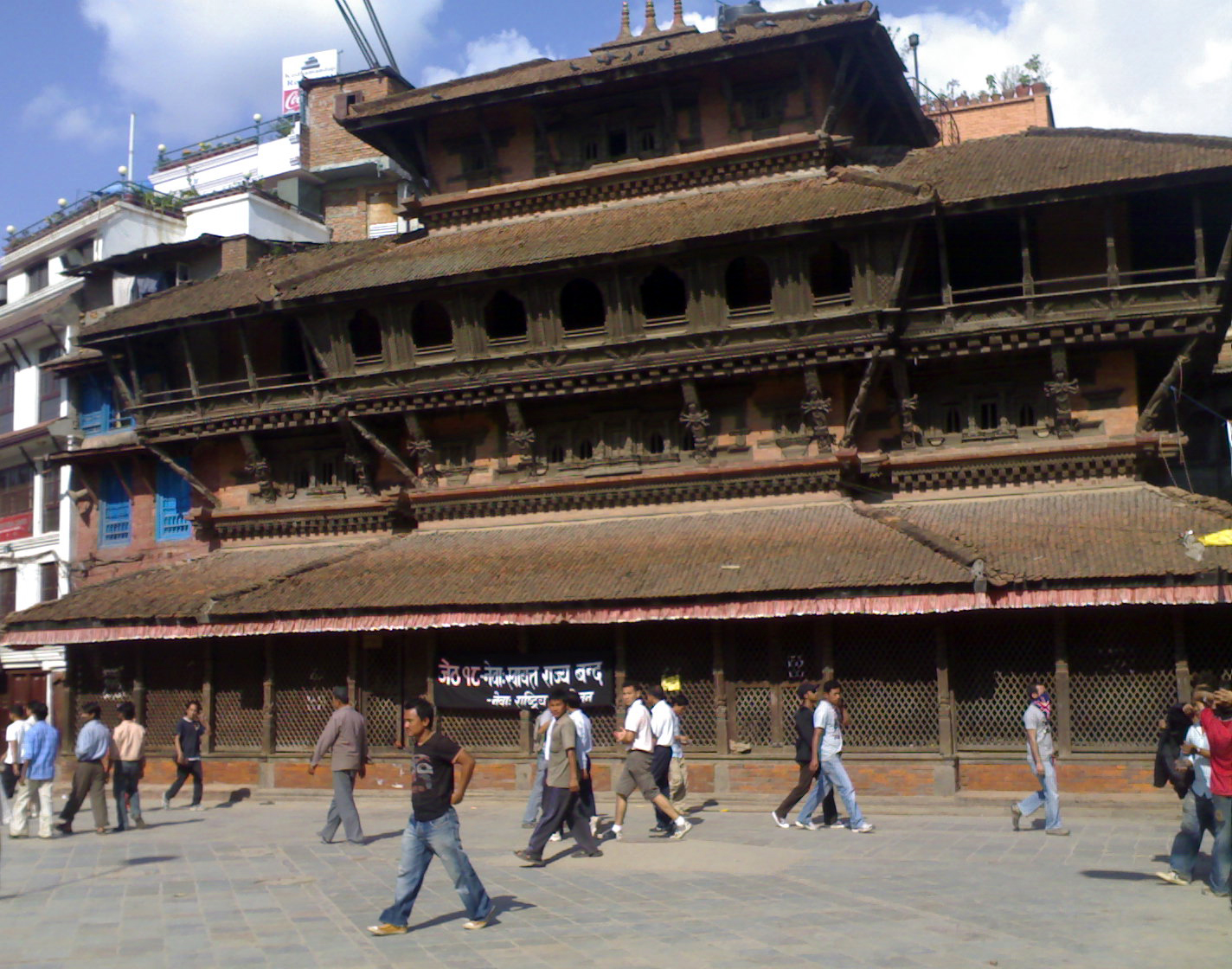
Dhansa Dega

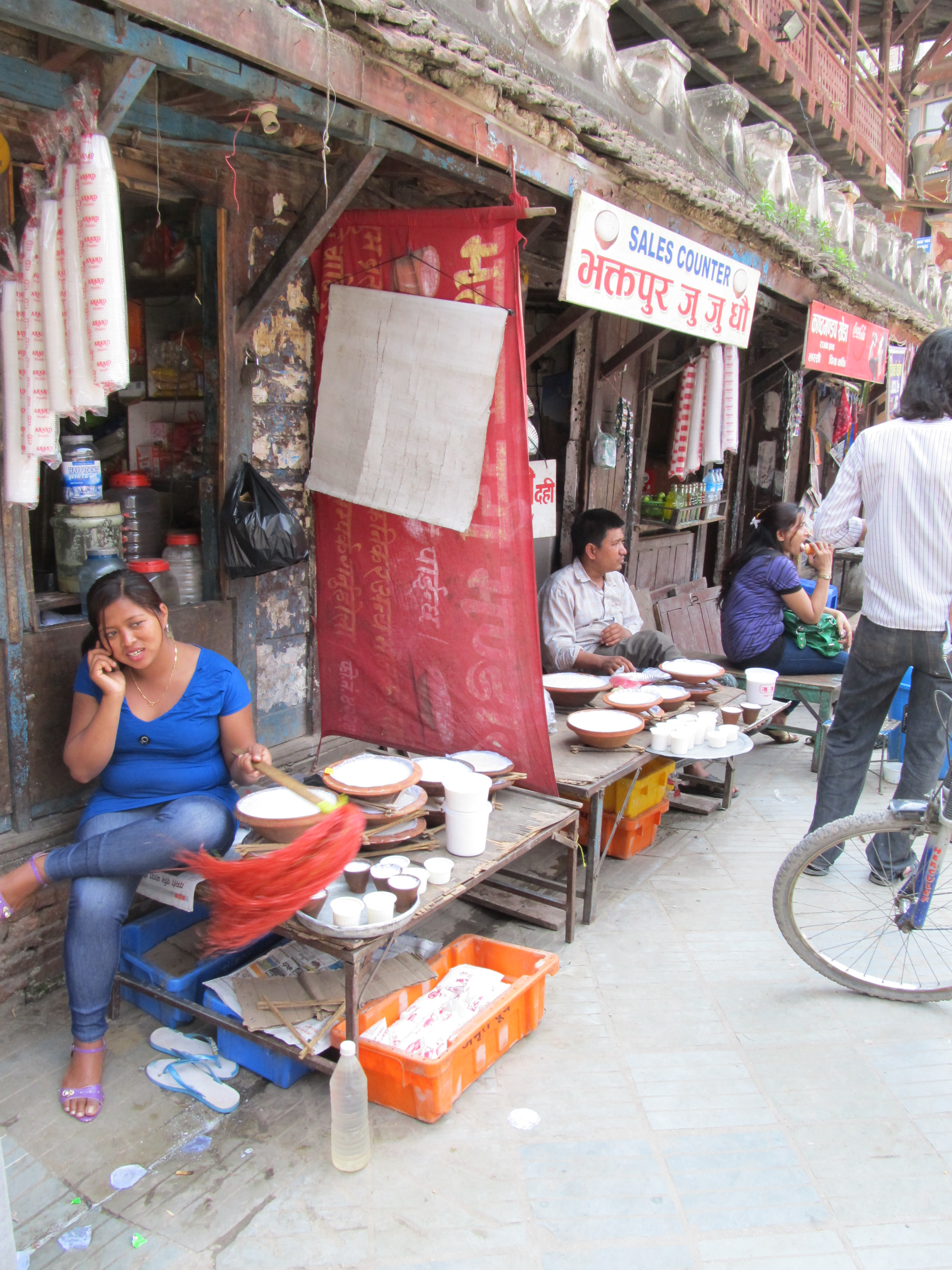
Yogurt sellers at Silyan Sata

Maru (Nepali: मरु) is a historic neighborhood in central Kathmandu, Nepal and one of the most important cultural spots in the city. It is linked with the origin of the name Kathmandu, and forms part of what is generically known as Durbar Square (including Kathmandu Durbar Square, Patan Durbar Square, and Bhaktapur Durbar Square), the old royal palace complexes of temples, shrines and palace buildings all of which have been declared UNESCO World Heritage Sites.

Maru is also a market square, a venue for religious festivals and a celebrated residential quarter. It is a crossroads where two ancient trade routes connecting India and Tibet intersect.

Maru consists of a large square encircled by temples and rest houses. It presents an example of a temple square typical of traditional Newar urban planning. Streets radiate out from the square, and inconspicuous entryways lead to residential courtyards that are home to silversmiths and other craftsmen.

== Landmarks ==
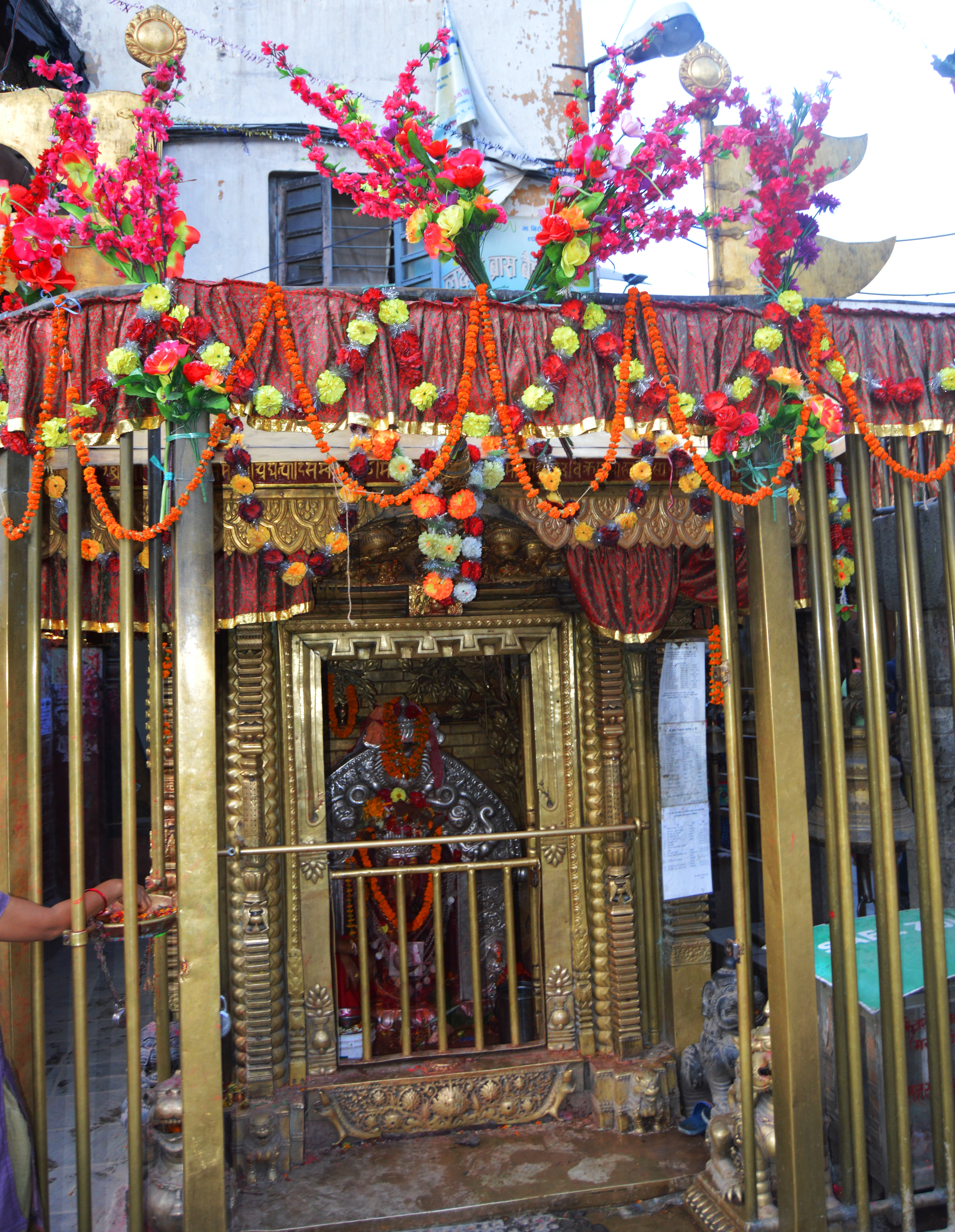
Maru Ganesh Temple

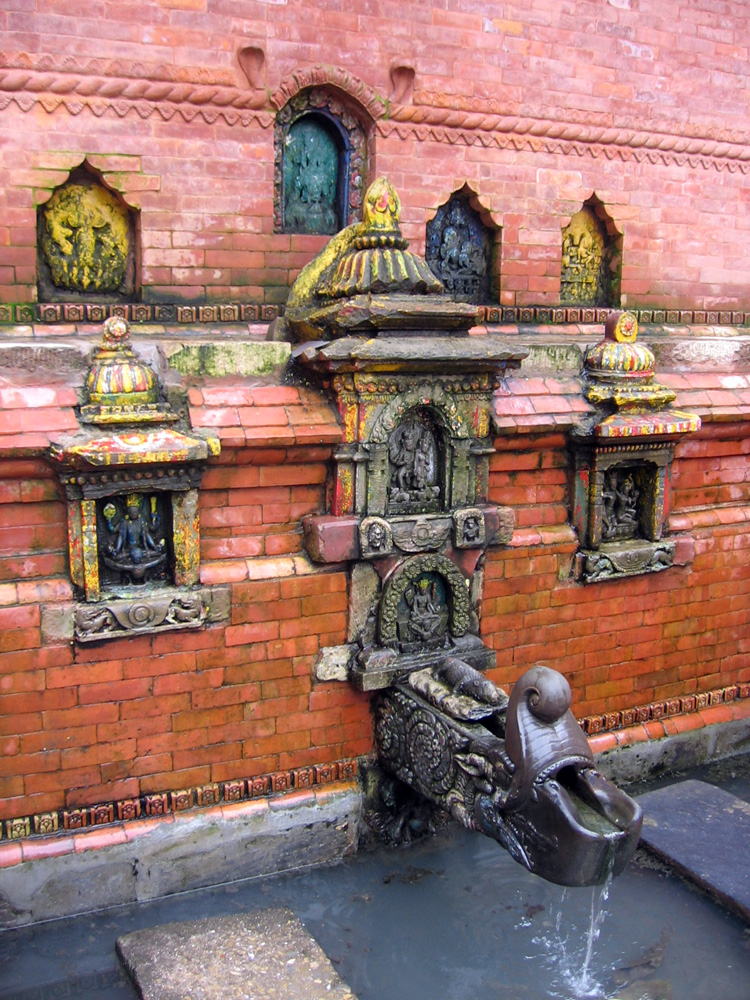
Maru Hiti

The square is dominated by the massive pagoda roofs of Maru Satah (मरु सत:) (Kasthamandap) which stands on the northern side of the square. Built in the 12th century, it houses a shrine of Gorakhnath. It was erected as a shelter for travellers on the trade route, and assumed its present shape in the 17th century. The name Kathmandu is derived from Kasthamandap.

On the eastern side stands Dhansā Degah (धन्सा देग:) (alternative name: Dhunsar), a 17th-century pagoda-shaped building. Its carved wood windows provide a specimen of the art of woodworking which has been highly developed in the Kathmandu Valley since ancient times. The upper part was destroyed in the great earthquake of 1934, and its height was shortened when it was repaired. It was originally a courthouse. A shrine to Nāsa Dya (नास: द्य:), the god of music, exists on the ground floor.

Silyan Sata (सिँल्यं सत:) (alternative name Singha Satah) on the southern side of the square dates from the 17th century. It contains shops on the ground floor and a hymn singing hall on the upper floor.

Gakuti (गकुति) is a three-sided courtyard on the western side of Maru. There is a temple dedicated to Mahadev at the center.

Lakhu Phalechā (लखु फलेचा), a roadside shelter at the corner of an alley at the southwest of Maru, is linked with the founding of Nepal Sambat. This is where the porters from Bhaktapur are said to have rested with their loads of sand. The procession of the goddess Dāgin, which is held during the Yenya festival, starts from this house.

The temple of Maru Ganesha (मरु गनेद्य:) on the northern side of Maru Sata is one of the more important Ganesh shrines in Kathmandu. A notable feature of this temple is the absence of the usual pinnacle.

Maruhiti (मरुहिति) is a celebrated stone water spout on an alley at the northwest of Maru. The alley was once famed by its nickname Pie Alley for the many pie shops here during the hippie days of the 1960s and 1970s.

== See also ==
- Bhaktapur Durbar Square
- Durbar Square
- Kathmandu Durbar Square
- Kathmandu Valley
- Patan Durbar Square
