= Indra Jatra =

Religious festival in Kathmandu, Nepal

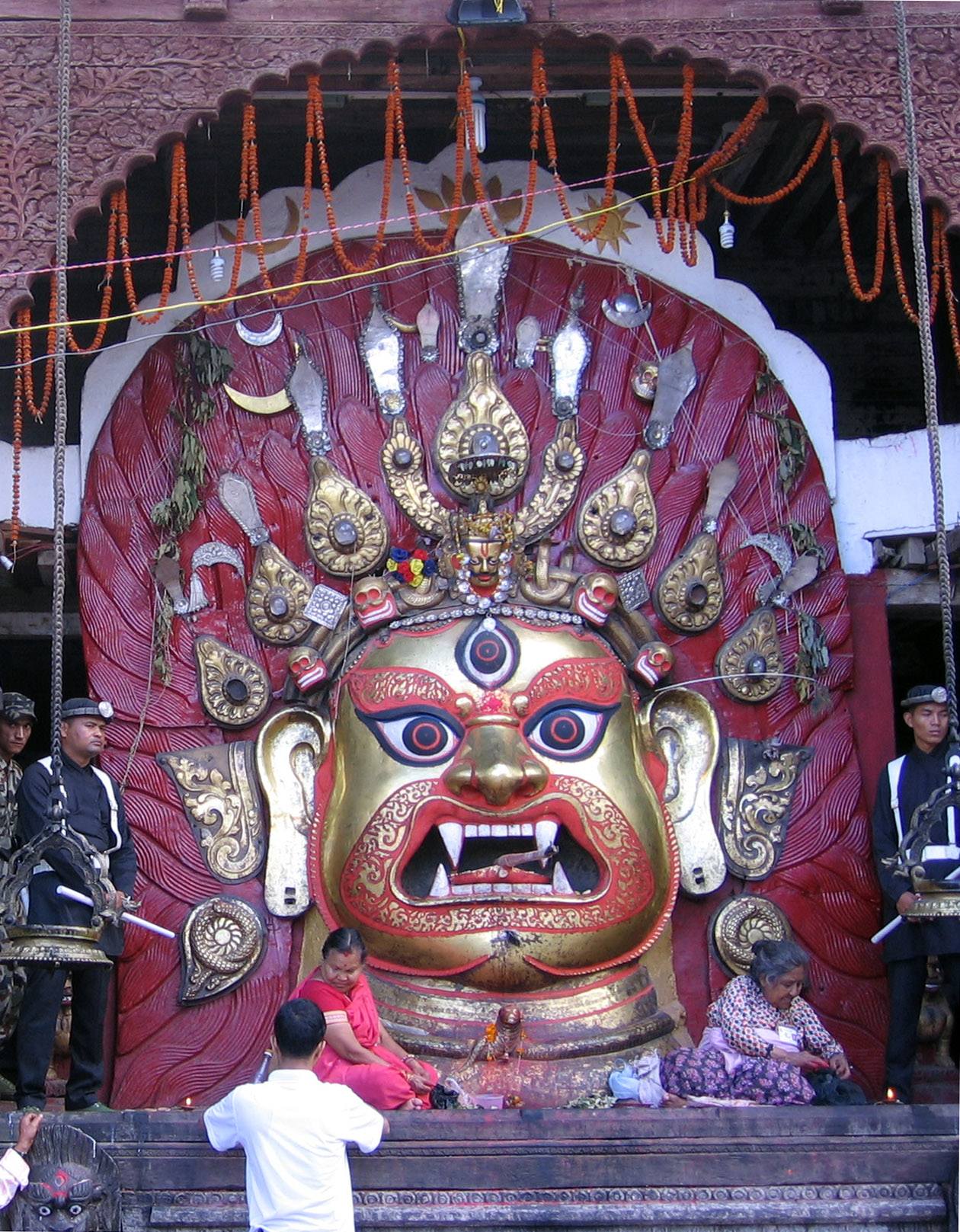
- Mask of Sweta Bhairava at Durbar Square
- Also called: Yenya in Nepali
- Observed by: Nepalis Hindus and Buddhists, Nepal
- Type: Religious
- Significance: celebrated to thank Lord Indra for bringing rain and ensuring a prosperous harvest marks the beginnings of the 2 greatest festivals of Hindu Nepalese
- Celebrations: Chariot processions on 25th of September 2026 (Kwaneyā) 26th of September 2026 (Thaneyā) 29th Of September 2026 (Nānichāyā)
- Observances: Processions, masked dances, tableau
- Begins: Yanlāthwā Dwadashi (ञलाथ्व द्वादशी)
- Ends: Yanlāgā Chaturthi (ञलागा: चतुर्थी)
- Duration: 8 days
- Frequency: Annual
- First time: 10th century (around 1000 A.D.)
- Started by: King Gunakamadeva

Indra Jātrā (Nepal Bhasa: 𑐂𑐣𑑂𑐡𑑂𑐬 𑐖𑐵𑐟𑑂𑐬𑐵), also known as Yenyā Punhi (Nepal Bhasa: 𑐫𑐾𑑃𑐫𑐵𑑅 𑐥𑐸𑐴𑑂𑐣𑐶), is the largest religious street festival originating in and unique to the Kathmandu Valley, Nepal. The celebrations consist of two events, Indra Jātrā and Kumāri Jātrā. Indra Jātrā is marked by masked dances of deities and demons, displays of sacred images, and tableaus in honor of the deity Indra, the king of heaven. Kumāri Jātrā is the chariot procession of the living goddess Kumari.

The festival is also observed in other cities of the Kathmandu Valley, including Bhaktapur and Patan, although the traditions, rituals, processions, and local customs differ from those of Kathmandu. In Bhaktapur, the festival has its own distinctive traditions and is locally observed as part of the city's broader cycle of annual religious festivals.

A smaller Yenya Punhi festival is held in Khokana, where a ceremonial pole is erected and statues of Indra as Khun Dhyo.

The festival is celebrated during Yenla (येँला), the eleventh month of the Nepal Sambat calendar. In Nepal Bhasa, the full-moon day is known as Punhi (पुन्हि). The full moon of Yenla is therefore called Yenya Punhi (येँयाः पुन्हि), literally referring to the full-moon day (Punhi) of Yenla. The name Yenya is derived from Yenla, the month during which the festival is celebrated.

Family members deceased in the past year are also remembered during the festival. The main venue of the festival is Kathmandu Durbar Square. The celebrations last for eight days from the 12th day of the bright fortnight to the 4th day of the dark fortnight of Yanlā (ञला), the eleventh month in the lunar Nepal Era calendar.

== History ==
Indra Jatra was started by King Gunakamadeva- (गुणकामदेव) to commemorate the founding of the Kathmandu city in the 10th century. Kumari Jatra began in the mid-18th century. The celebrations are held according to the lunar calendar, so the dates are changeable.

== Opening ceremony ==
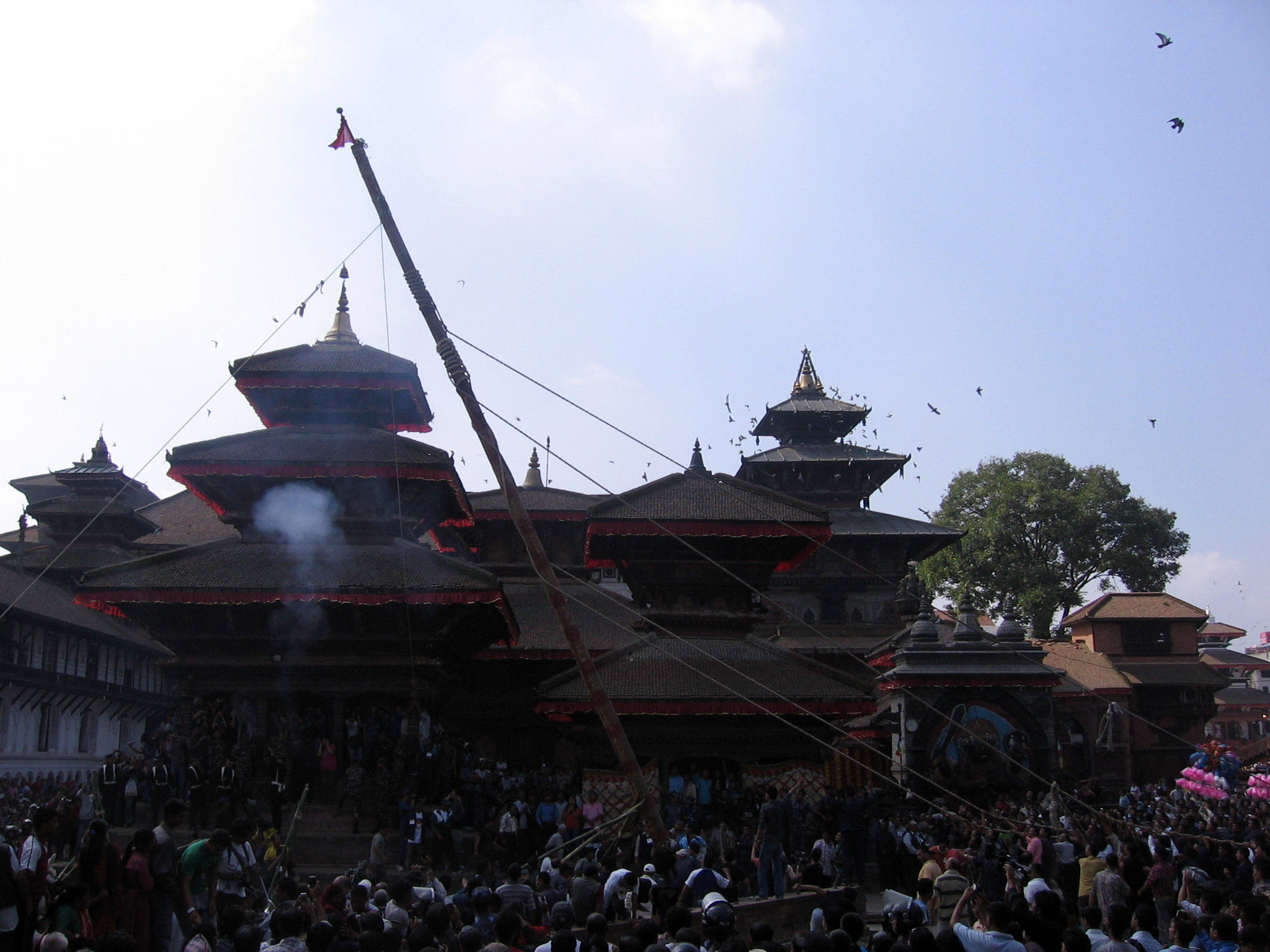
Raising the Yosin pole

The festival starts with Yosin Thanegu (योसिं थनेगु), the erection of Yosin, a pole from which the banner of Indra is unfurled, at Kathmandu Durbar Square. The pole, a tree shorn of its branches and stripped of its bark, is obtained from a forest near Nālā, a small town 29 km to the east of Kathmandu. It is dragged in stages to Durbar Square by men pulling on ropes.

Another event on the first day is Upāku Wanegu (उपाकु वनेगु) when participants visit shrines holding lighted incense to honor deceased family members. They also place small butter lamps on the way. Some sing hymns as they make the tour. The circuitous route winds along the periphery of the historic part of the city. The procession starts at around 4 pm.

== Processions ==
=== Kumari Jatra ===
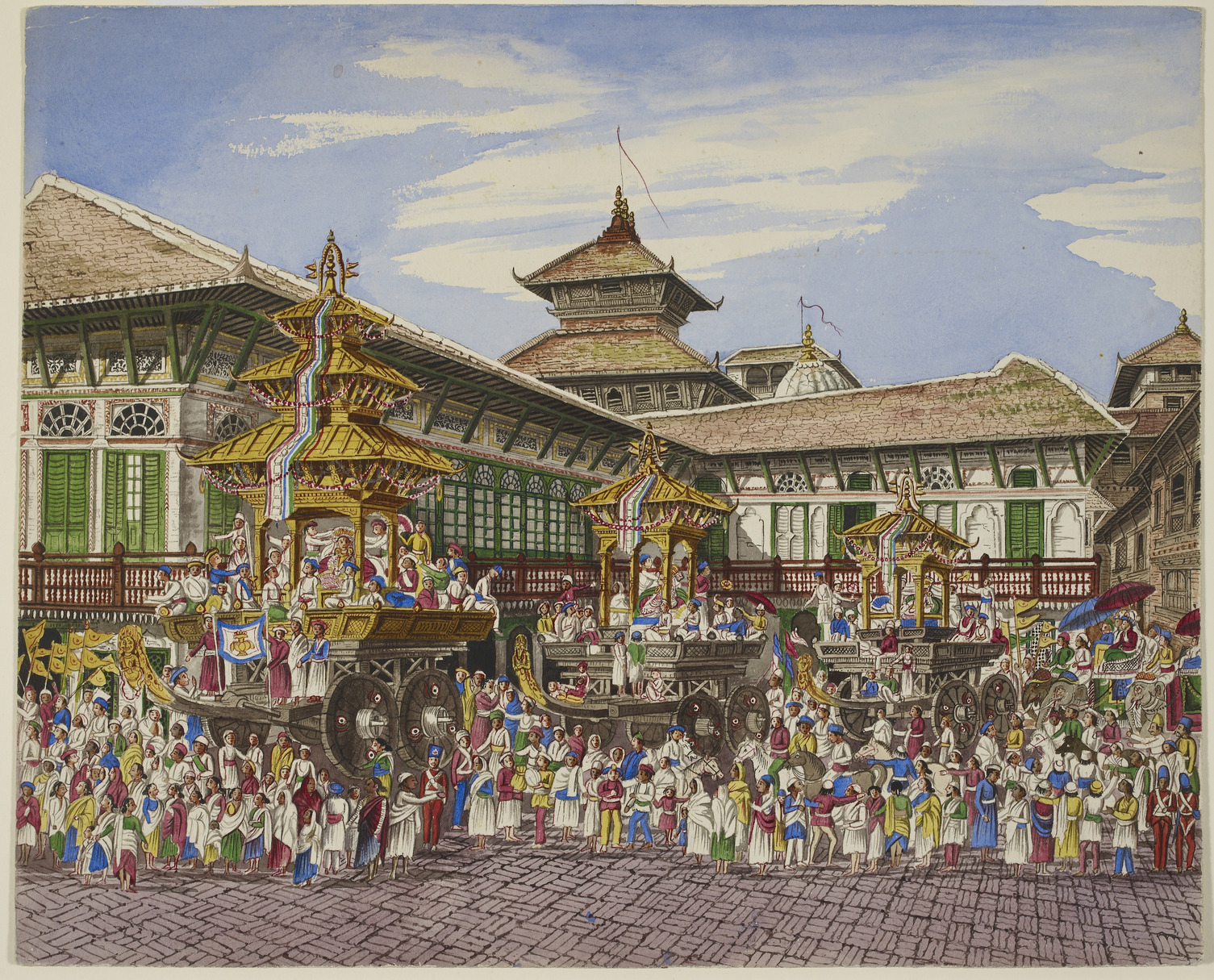
Kumari Jatra in the 1850s, in front of the Hanuman Dhoka

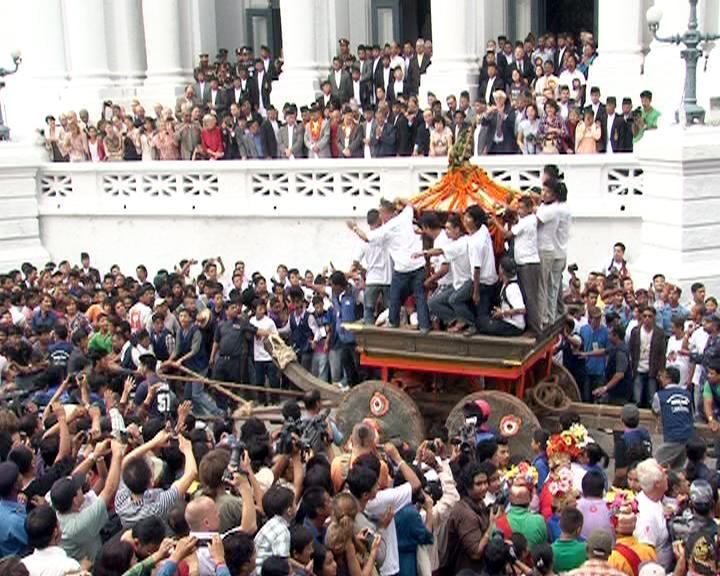
Chariot procession

Kumari Jatra, which means the chariot festival of Kumari, coincides with Indra Jatra. It was started in 1756 AD during the reign of Jaya Prakash Malla.

During this festival, three chariots carrying human representations of the deities Ganesh, Bhairava and Kumari accompanied by musical bands are pulled along the festival route through Kathmandu on three days. The procession starts at around 3 pm.

On the first day of Kumari Jatra known as Kwaneyā (क्वनेया:), the chariots are pulled through the southern part of town. The second day is the full moon day known as Yenya Punhi (येँयाः पुन्हि). During the procession known as Thaneyā (थनेया:), the chariots are drawn through the northern part till Asan. And on the third day Nānichāyā (नानिचाया:), the procession passes through the central section at Kilāgal. Since 2012, the chariot of Kumari has been pulled by an all women's team on the third day of the chariot festival.

- Route on first day of chariot festival, Kwaneyā (downtown procession): Basantapur, Maru, Chikanmugal, Jaisidewal, Lagan, Brahma Marga, Wonde, Hyumata, Kohity, Bhimsensthan, Maru, Basantapur.
- Lord Bhairab in the Chariot
  Route on second day of chariot festival, Thaneyā (uptown procession): Basantapur, Pyaphal, Yatkha, Nyata, Tengal, Nhyokha, Nhaikan Tol, Asan, Kel Tol, Indra Chowk, Makhan, Basantapur.
- Route on third day of chariot festival, Nānichāyā (midtown procession): Basantapur, Pyaphal, Yatkha, Nyata, Kilagal, Bhedasing, Indra Chowk, Makhan, Basantapur.

=== Mata Biye / Upaku Wanegu ===
Mata Biye (मत बिये) / Upaku Wanegu (उपाकु वनेगु ) means to offer butter lamps. On the day of Kwaneyā, the first day of the chariot festival, Newars honor family members deceased during the past year by offering small butter lamps along the processional route. They also present butter lamps to relatives and friends on the way as a mark of respect. The procession starts at around 6 pm.

- Route: Maru, Pyaphal, Yatkha, Nyata, Tengal, Nhyokha, Nhaikan Tol, Asan, Kel Tol, Indra Chowk, Makhan, Hanuman Dhoka, Maru, Chikanmugal, Jaisidewal, Lagan, Hyumata, Bhimsensthan, Maru.
- Day: On the day of Kwaneyā.

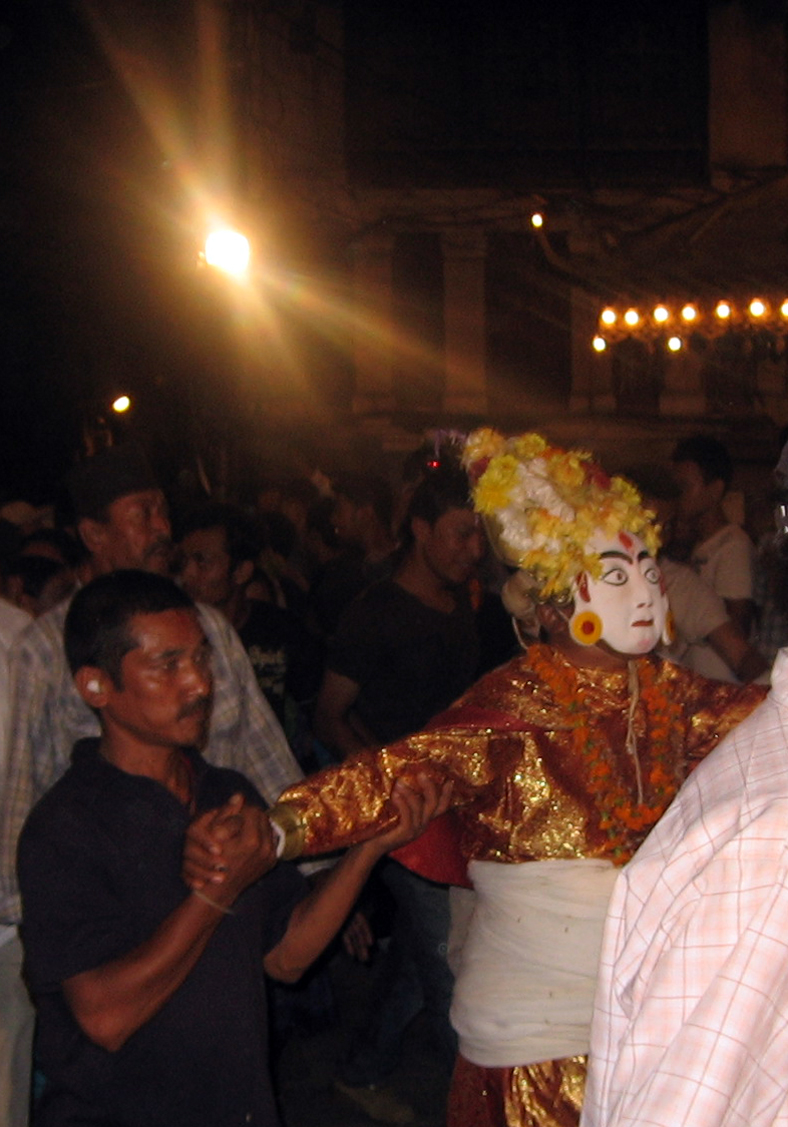
Dagin procession

=== Dagin ===
The procession of the goddess Dāgin (दागिं) (alternative name: Dāgim) re-enacts Indra mother's going around town in search of her son. The procession consists of a man wearing a mask accompanied by a musical band. It starts at after the chariot of Kumari returns to Basantapur after journeying around the southern part of town. Dagin is followed by many people who have lost a family member that year.

The procession begins from an alley at the south-western corner of Maru square and passes by the western side of Kasthamandap. The participants follow the festival route north to Asan and then back to Durbar Square. The procession continues to the southern end of town before returning to Maru.

- Route: Maru, Pyaphal, Yatkha, Nyata, Tengal, Nhyokha, Nhaikan Tol, Asan, Kel Tol, Indra Chowk, Makhan, Hanuman Dhoka, Maru, Chikanmugal, Jaisidewal, Lagan, Hyumata, Bhimsensthan, Maru.
- Day: On the day of Kwaneyā.

=== Bau Mata ===
Bau Mata (बौँ मत:) consists of a long representation of a holy snake made of reeds on which a row of oil lamps are placed. The effigy is suspended from poles carried on the shoulders and taken along the festival route. The procession starts from the southern side of Kasthamandap at Maru. When the Dagin procession returns from the upper part of town and reaches Maru, that is the cue for the Bau Mata procession to set off. It starts after Dagin has returned to Maru and is organized by the Manandhar caste group.

- Route: Maru, Pyaphal, Yatkha, Nyata, Tengal, Nhyokha, Nhaikan Tol, Asan, Kel Tol, Indra Chowk, Makhan, Hanuman Dhoka, Maru, Chikanmugal, Jaisidewal, Lagan, Hyumata, Bhimsensthan, Maru.
- Day: On the day of Kwaneyā.

== Exhibitions ==
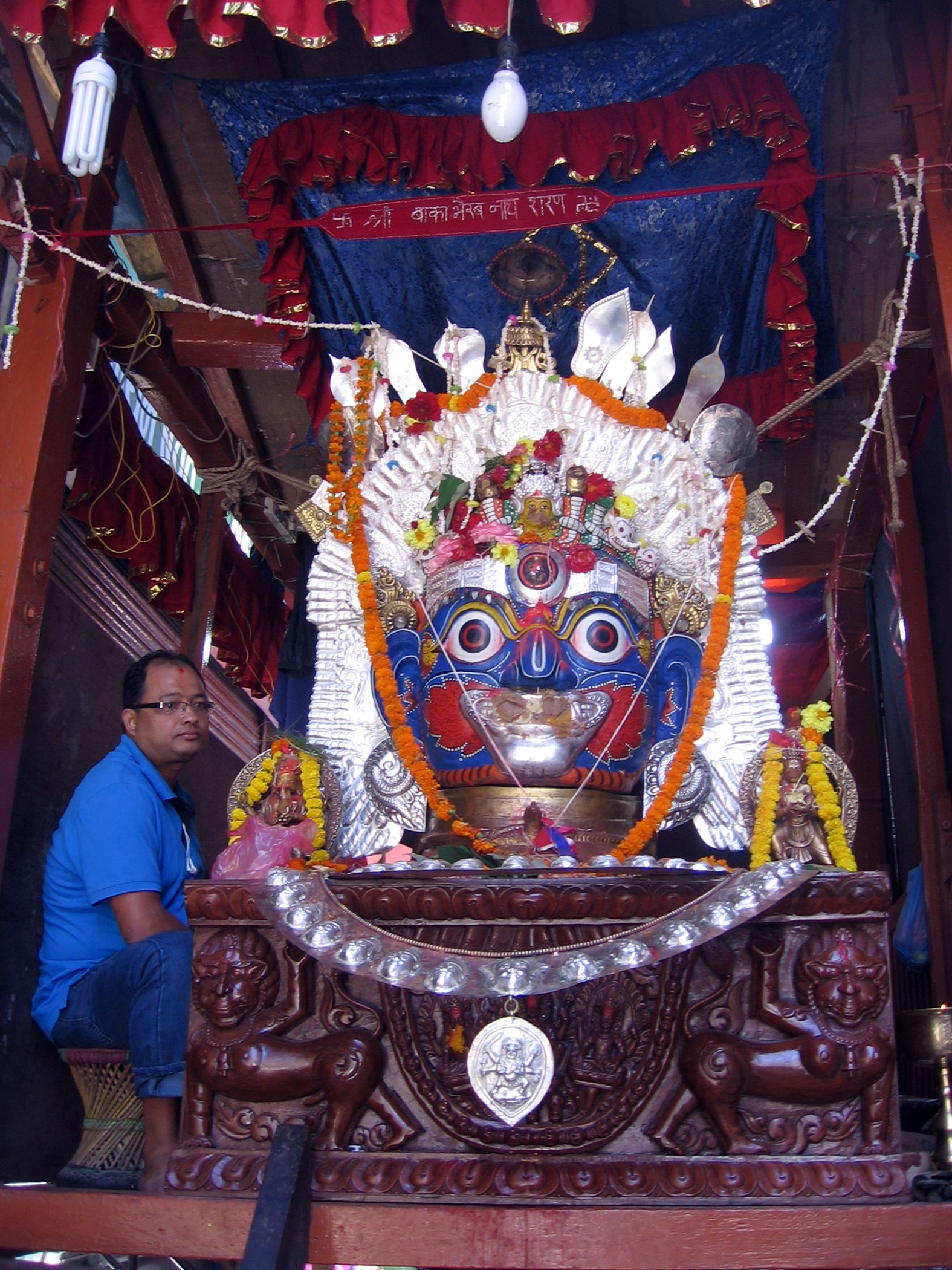
Bākā Bhairava at Wotu

=== Bhairava ===
Masks of Bhairava are displayed at various places in Kathmandu throughout the eight days of the festival. Bhairava is the terrifying aspect of Shiva. The largest ones are of Sweta Bhairava at Durbar Square, and of Akash Bhairava at Indra Chowk. A pipe sticking out of the mouth of Sweta Bhairava dispenses alcohol and rice beer on different days. An image of Bākā Bhairava is exhibited at Wotu, next to Indra Chok.

The mask of Aakash Bhairava is related to the Mahabharata. Some believe it to be the head of the first Kirat King Yalambar. Every night, different groups gather and sing hymns at Indra Chowk.

=== Indraraj Dyah ===
Images of Indraraj Dyah with his outstretched hands bound with rope are exhibited on a high platform at Maru near Durbar Square and at Indra Chowk, Kathmandu.

=== Dasavatar ===
A tableau, known as Dasavatar or the 10 incarnations of Vishnu, is shown on the temple steps in front of Kumari House every night.

== Masked dances ==

=== Pulu Kisi (पुलु किसि) ===
This is performed by the residents of Kilagal tole. Pulu Kisi is believed to be the carrier of Indra himself. Pulu Kisi goes through the streets of the ancient city Kathmandu in search for his imprisoned master. People view the masked creature with the roar of excitement and laughter. From time to time It does naughty and mischievous things by running through the street knocking anyone that comes in its path and swinging its tail in an amazing manner. Like other dancers, he also has a team of a musical band and a torch carrier in front.

=== Majipā Lākhey ===
The demon dance of Majipā Lākhey is performed on the streets and market squares. The Majipa Lakhey dancer and his retinue of musicians move with much agility .He alongside Pulukisi helps in crowd control before chariot procession through the streets and crowds spreading the festive mood. It is the only time when people can see Majipa Lakhey on entire year.

=== Sawa Bhakku ===

The Sawa Bhakku dance group from HalChowk, at the western edge of the Kathmandu Valley, makes its rounds along the festival route, stopping at major street squares to perform and receive offerings from devotees. The dancers consist of Bhairava (in blue) holding a sword and his two attendants (in red). The ensemble is also known informally as Dhin Nāli Sintān after the sound of their music.

=== Dee Pyākhan ===
Dee Pyākhan from Kilagha, Kathmandu is performed at Kilagha, Jaisidewal, Bangemuda and Indrachowk. Dancers wearing masks of various gods & goddesses that includes Bhairav, Kumari, Chandi, Daitya, Kawoh, Beta, & Khyah. As per historical themes The Dee Pyākhan was started at the time of King Gunakar Raj Dev.

=== Māhākāli Pyakhan ===
Māhākāli Pyakhan from Bhaktapur performs at Durbar Square and major street squares around Kathmandu. Khyāh Pyākhan (ख्याः प्याखं) features dancers dressed in a costume representing the Khyah, a fat, hairy ape-like creature. Their dance is marked by antics and a lot of tumbling.

== In Basantapur ==
Crowd in Basantapur to observe Indra Jatra

Indra Jatra is celebrated in Basantapur by erecting poles representing Indra at various localities around the city. The poles are known as Yambodyah. Masked dances and Pulu Kisi dance are also performed.

== In Bhaktapur ==
Indra Jātrā is also observed in Bhaktapur, where it has a distinct set of local rituals and processions. Unlike the Kathmandu celebration, which prominently features the Kumari Jātrā and the erection of the Yosin pole, the Bhaktapur observances focus on Yama Dyaḥ, Yamata, Indrayani Jātrā, Mupatra and Pulu Kisi. The local observances take place over the eight-day period of the festival and are associated with Yenya Punh.

=== Yama Dyaḥ Thanigu ===
The Bhaktapur observances begin with Yama Dyaḥ Thanigu (यमद्यः थनिगु), in which poles representing Yama, the deity associated with death, are erected at several localities (toles) in the city. The poles are worshipped throughout the festival period. According to local tradition, worship of Yama Dyaḥ is associated with protection from death.

=== Yamata ===
A distinctive Bhaktapur observance is Yamata (याँमता), a traditional Akash Deep or sky lamp. The lamp is made using bamboo and is carried through parts of the city as part of the festival rituals. Local accounts describe Yamata processions associated with several ponds, including Kamal Pokhari, Mugathau Pukhu and Taḥ Pukhu (Siddha Pokhari). The Yamata observance is also associated with the Mupatra ceremonies.

=== Indrayani Jātrā ===
On one of the festival days, Indrayani Jātrā is held in Bhaktapur. The goddess Indrayani is worshipped in this context as the consort of Indra, rather than solely as one of the Aṣṭamātṛkā goddesses. Her image is brought from her dyochhen (deity house) and carried in procession through the city.

The procession eventually reaches Taḥ Pukhu (Siddha Pokhari), the largest historic pond in Bhaktapur. The pond is traditionally associated with the name Indra Daha. The image of Indrayani is kept overnight in a phalcha, while Siddha Pokhari is illuminated with oil lamps. The combination of the illuminated pond and the deity's overnight stay is one of the notable features of the Bhaktapur observance.

=== You Dyaḥ Punhi ===
The day following Indrayani Jātrā is known locally as You Dyaḥ Punhi, corresponding to Yenya Punhi. It is associated with the Siddha Pokhari Mela, when devotees, including people from surrounding settlements, gather at Siddha Pokhari for bathing and worship. Following the observances, the image of Indrayani is returned to her deity house.

=== Mupatra ===
Mupatra (मूपात्र) is a distinctive masked figure associated with the Bhaktapur celebration. He is accompanied by two attendants known as Dhi (धिःचा). The performers wear elaborate demon-like costumes, apply facial makeup and carry swords while processing through the historic parts of the city.

Local accounts describe Mupatra Jātrā as a three-day sequence of processions and rituals. One of its distinctive ceremonies involves Mupatra visiting the Yama Dyaḥ shrines in different neighbourhoods. According to the local tradition, Mupatra circles a Yama Dyaḥ three times and strikes it with his sword.

=== Pulu Kisi ===

Pulu Kisi (पुलुकिसि), representing the elephant of Indra, is another major feature of the Bhaktapur observance. The procession traditionally begins at Lakulachhen and proceeds towards Dattatraya Square. The elephant figure is accompanied by traditional music and crowds as it moves through the historic city.

Local accounts differ in their interpretation of Pulu Kisi. It is generally associated with Airavata, Indra's celestial elephant, and with the search for Indra during the festival. Some Bhaktapur traditions also preserve a local version of the story involving Jayanta, Indra's son, and the search for the Parijat flower.

=== Mupatra and Pulu Kisi ===
A distinctive feature of the Bhaktapur tradition is the customary avoidance of direct contact between Mupatra and Pulu Kisi. In local interpretations, Pulu Kisi represents Indra's elephant, while Mupatra represents a demonic force opposed to Indra. Their separate routes and timing therefore form part of the ritual structure of the festival. Local tradition holds that an encounter between the two could result in a confrontation.

The Bhaktapur observances thus preserve a local interpretation of the wider Indra Jātrā tradition, combining worship of Yama and Indrayani with masked performances, processions, traditional music and the Pulu Kisi and Mupatra narratives.

== Mythology ==
Indra Jatra is celebrated in honor of Lord Indra, the Hindu king of the heavens. Indra is renowned for his role in ensuring the welfare and prosperity of humanity by regulating rainfall and fostering abundant harvests. Indra Jatra is always celebrated at the time of the retreat of the summer monsoon, and the time when rice paddies are blooming and heavy rainfall could damage the crops. According to legend, Indra (Hindu god-king of heaven), disguised as a farmer, descended to earth in search of parijat swã (Night jasmine), a white flower his mother Basundhara needed to perform a ritual. As he was plucking the flowers at Maruhiti, a sunken water spout at Maru, the people caught and bound him like a common thief. He was then put on display in the town square of Maru in Kathmandu. (In a reenactment of this event, an image of Indra with his hands bound is put on display at Maru and other places during the festival.)

His mother, worried about his extended absence, came to Kathmandu and wandered around looking for him. (This event is commemorated by the procession of Dagin (दागिं) through the city. Pulu Kisi (alternate name Tānā Kisi), a wicker representation of an elephant, also runs around town reenacting Indra's elephant searching frantically for its master.)

When the city folk realized they had captured Indra himself, they were appalled and immediately released him. Out of appreciation for his release, his mother promised to provide enough dew throughout the winter to ensure a rich crop. It is said that Kathmandu starts to experience foggy mornings from this festival onwards because of this boon.

== Closing ceremony ==
On the last day, the yosin pole erected at Durbar Square is taken down in a ceremony known as Yosin Kwathalegu (योसिं क्वथलेगु). It marks the end of the festivities.

== Open air theater ==
Yenya is also the season of open air theatre productions. Performances depicting social themes, satire and comedy are held on dance platforms or makeshift stages at market squares all over the Kathmandu Valley on the sidelines of the sacred festival. The plays, known as Dabu Pyākhan (दबू प्याखं), have a history going back centuries.

== Gallery ==
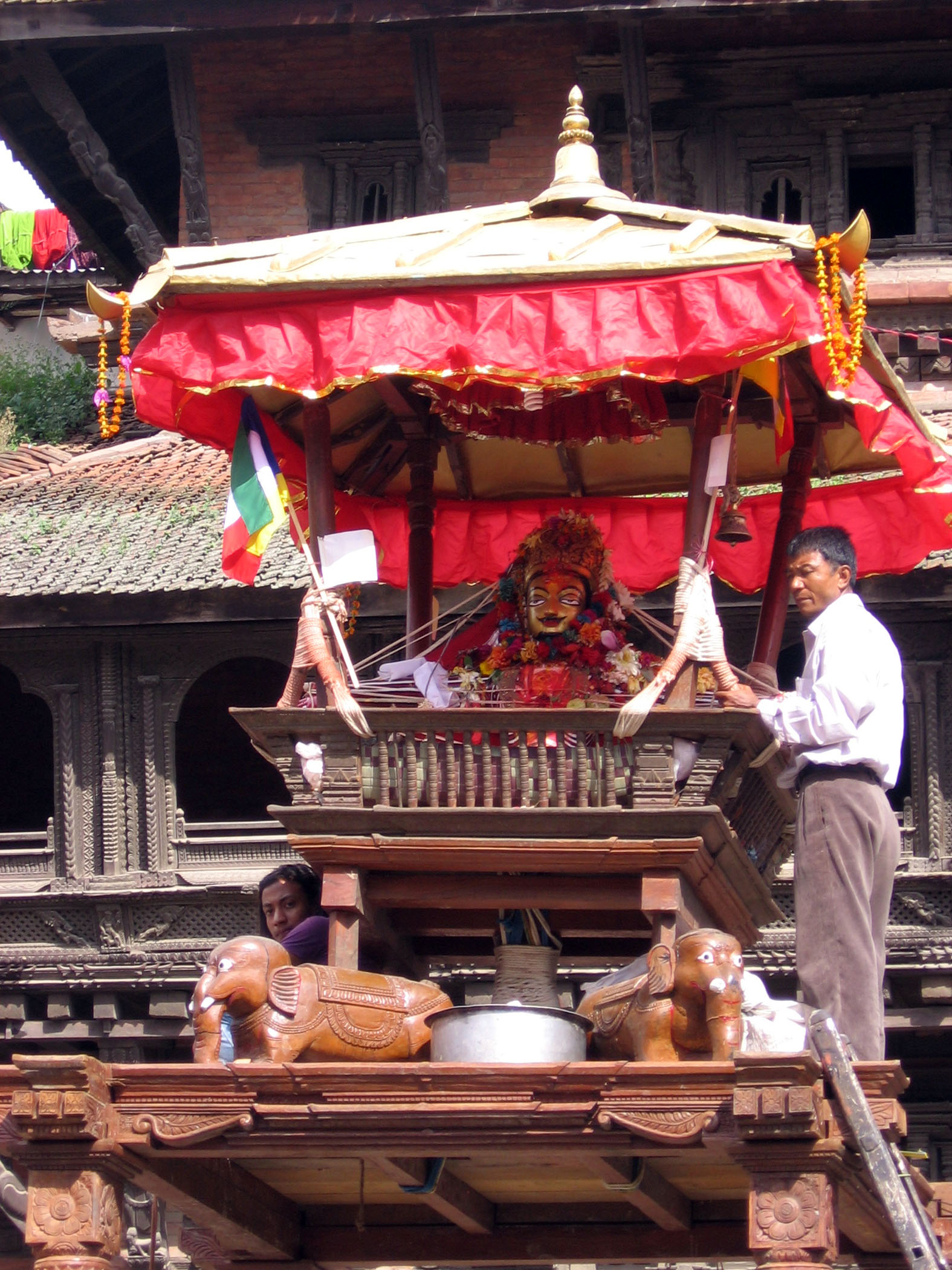
Statue of Indra with his hands bound at Maru

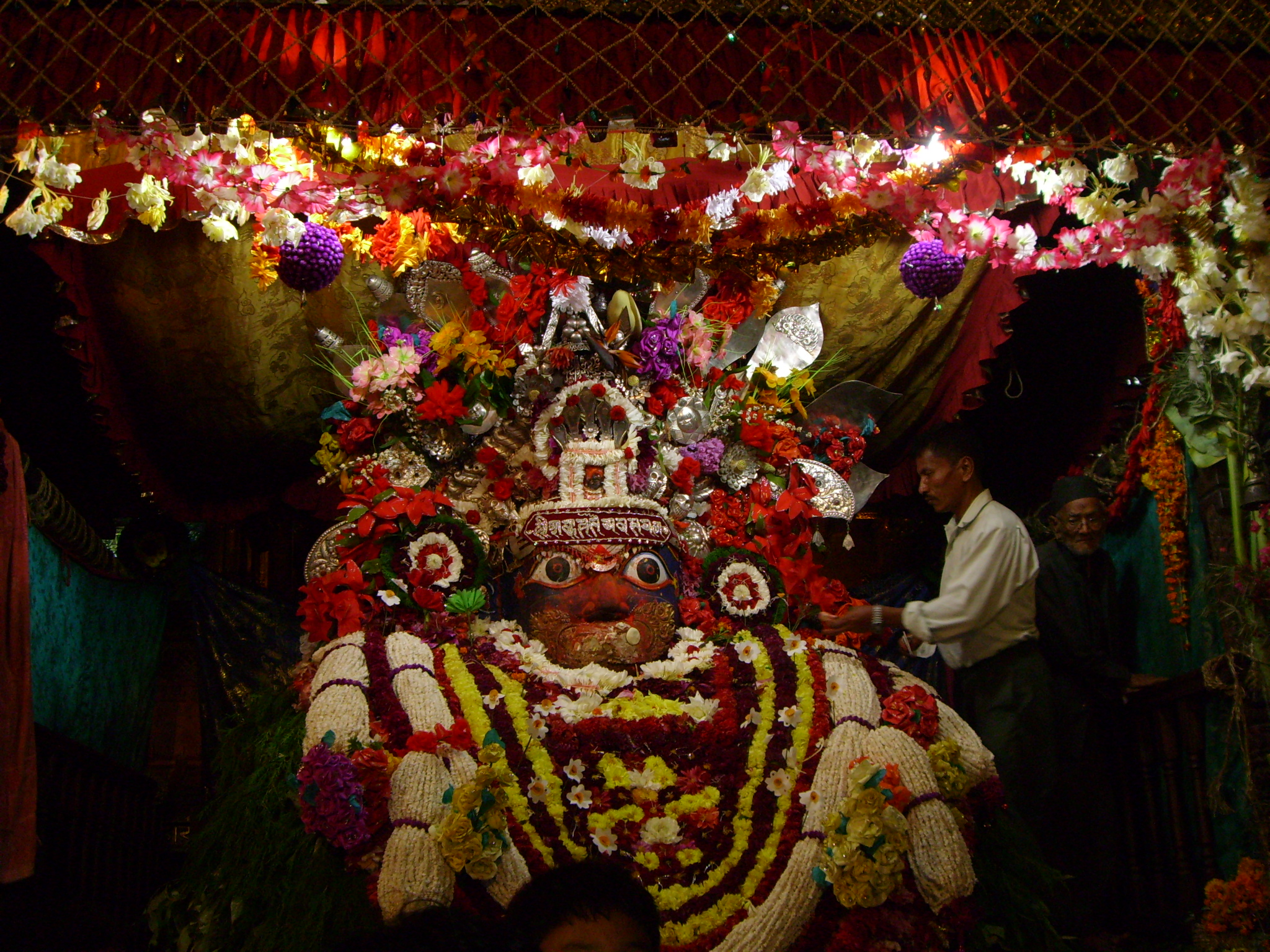
Mask of Akash Bhairava at Indra Chowk

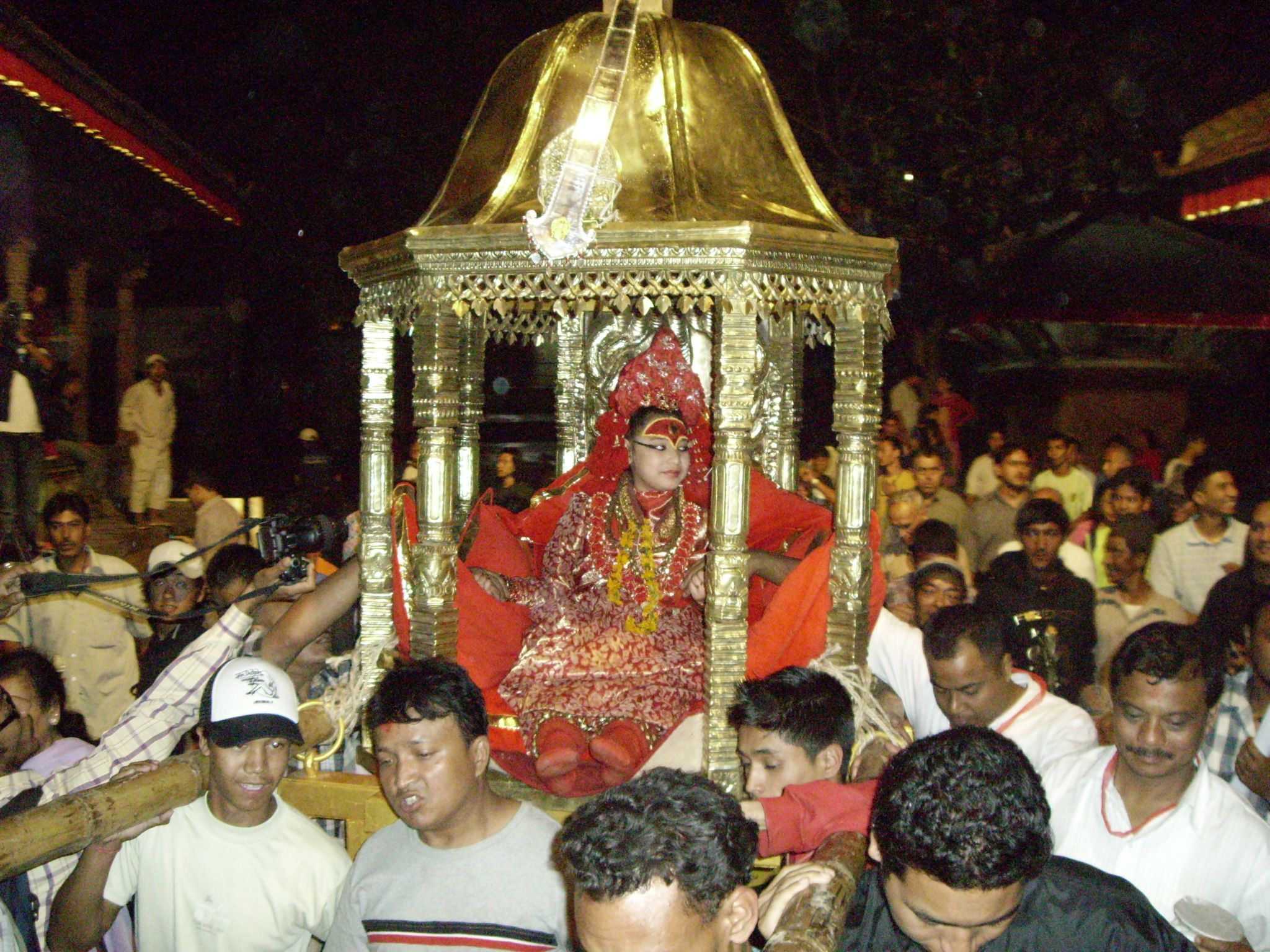
Living goddess Kumari

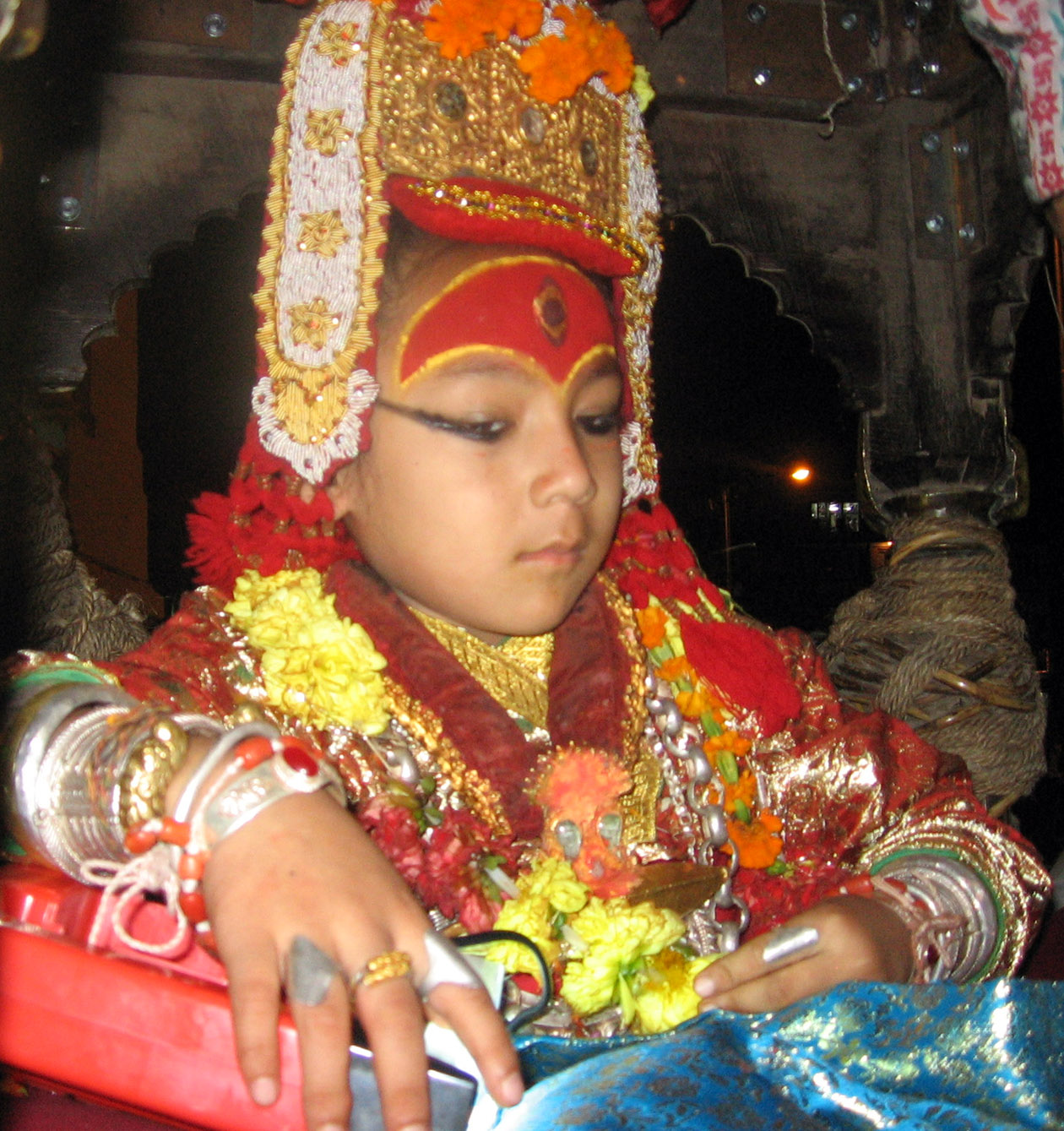
Child representing Bhairava (Bhelu)

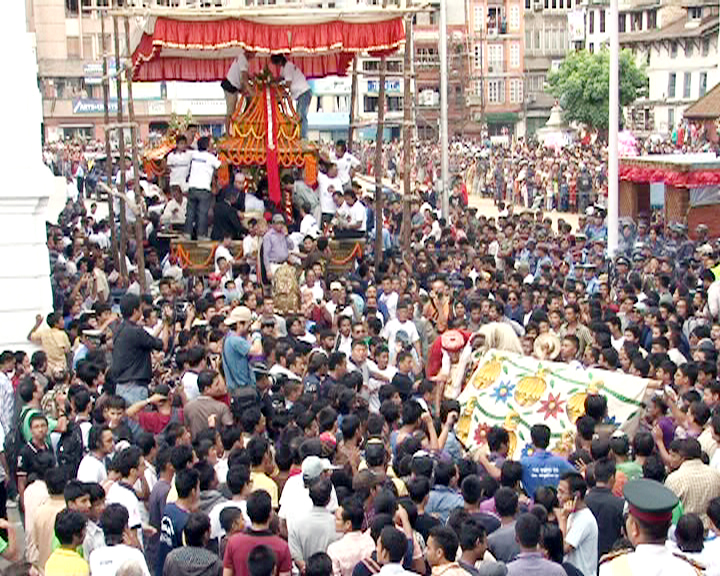
Chariot of Kumari

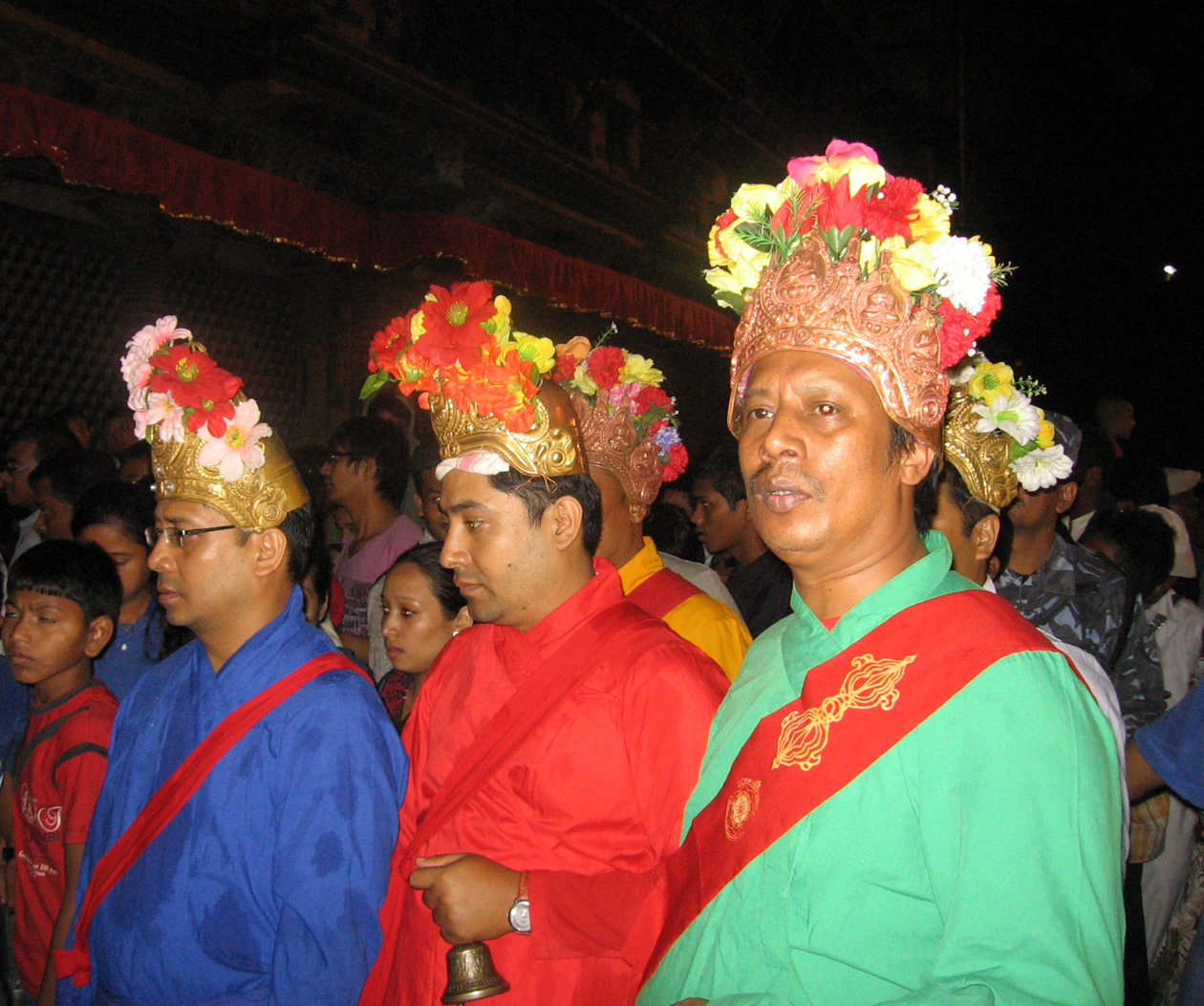
Buddhist priests during chariot procession

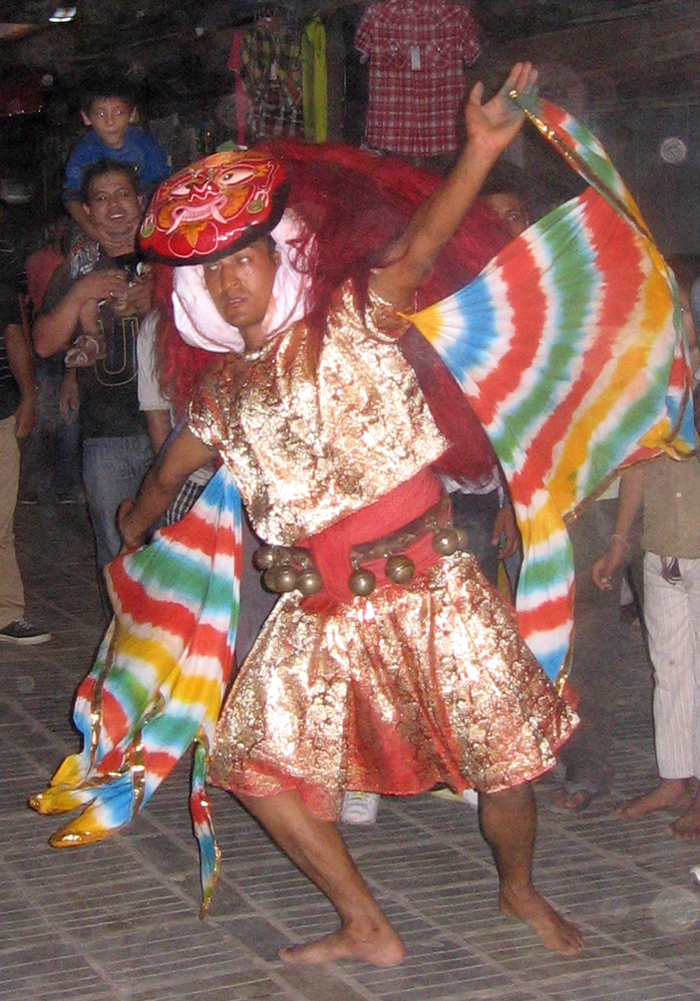
Majipa Lakhe dancer

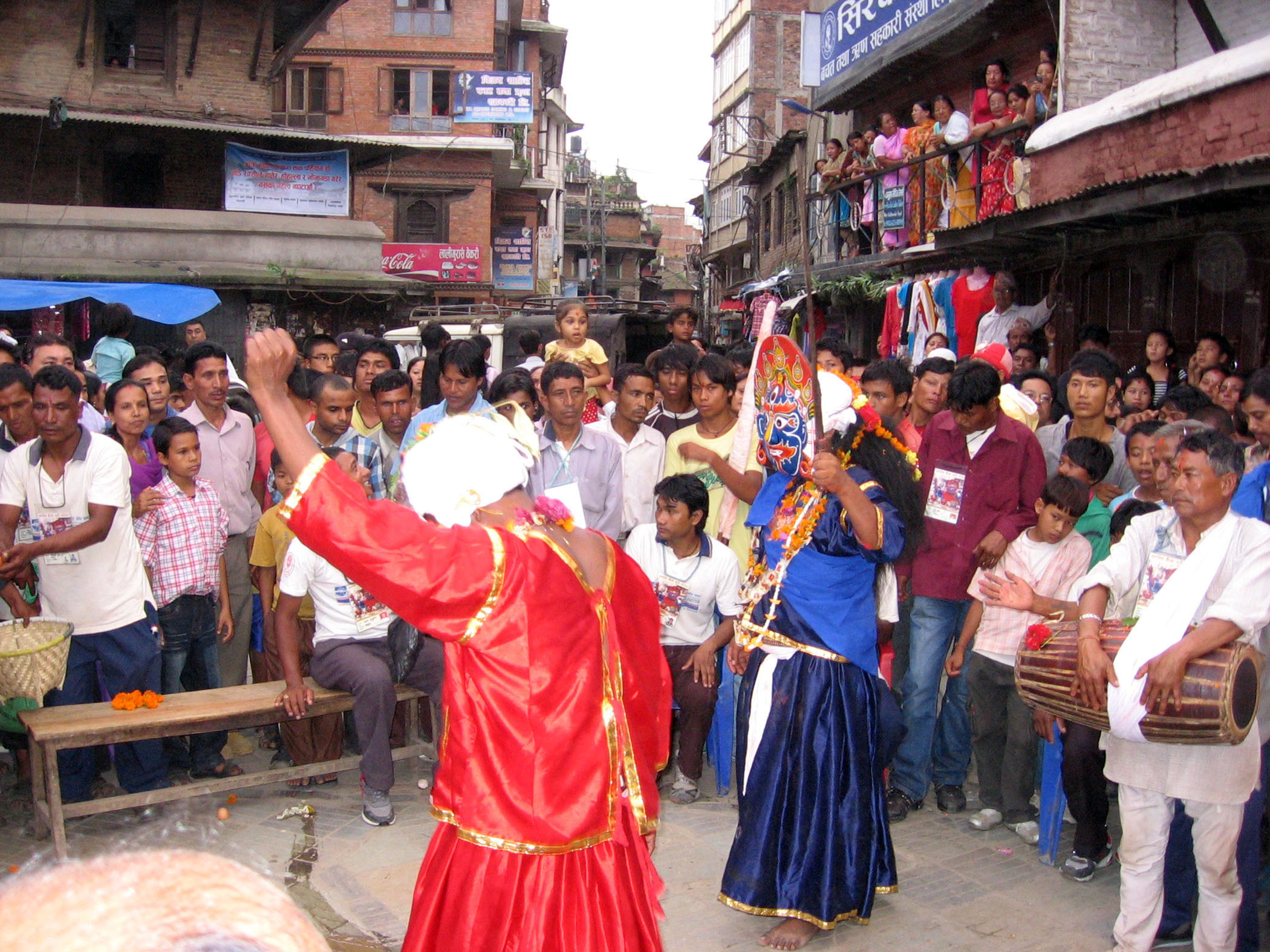
Sawa Bhakku

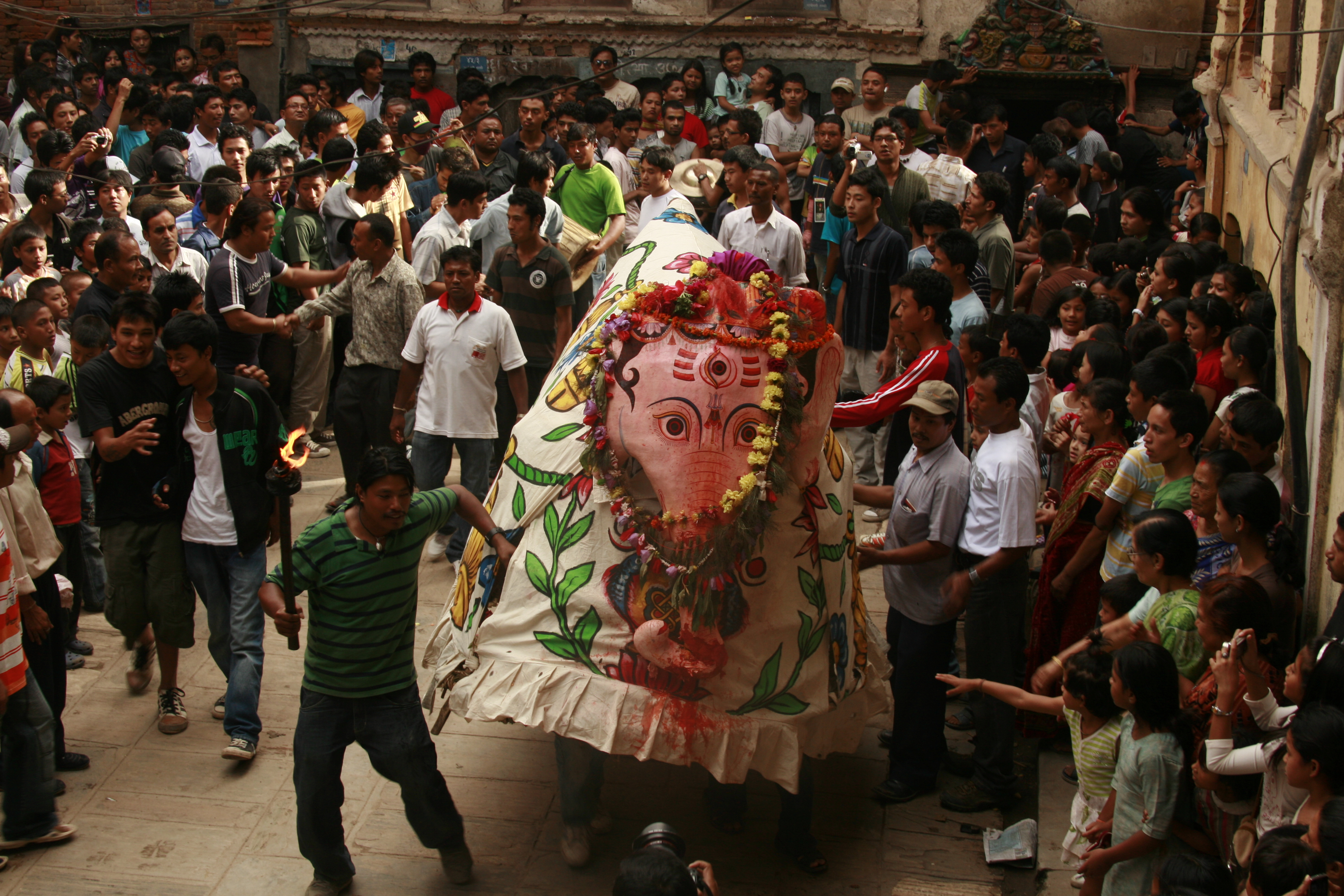
Pulu Kisi dance

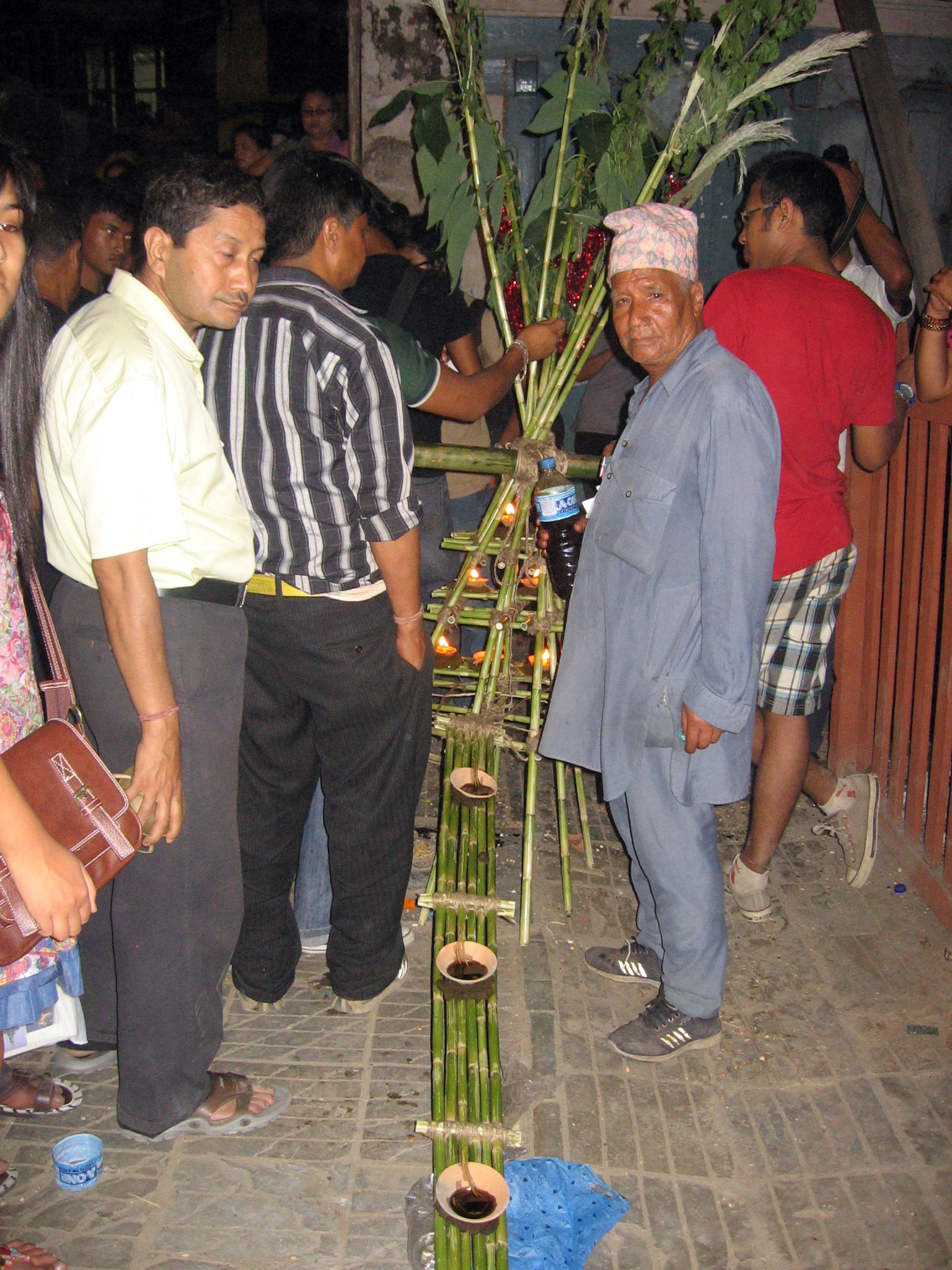
Bau Mata

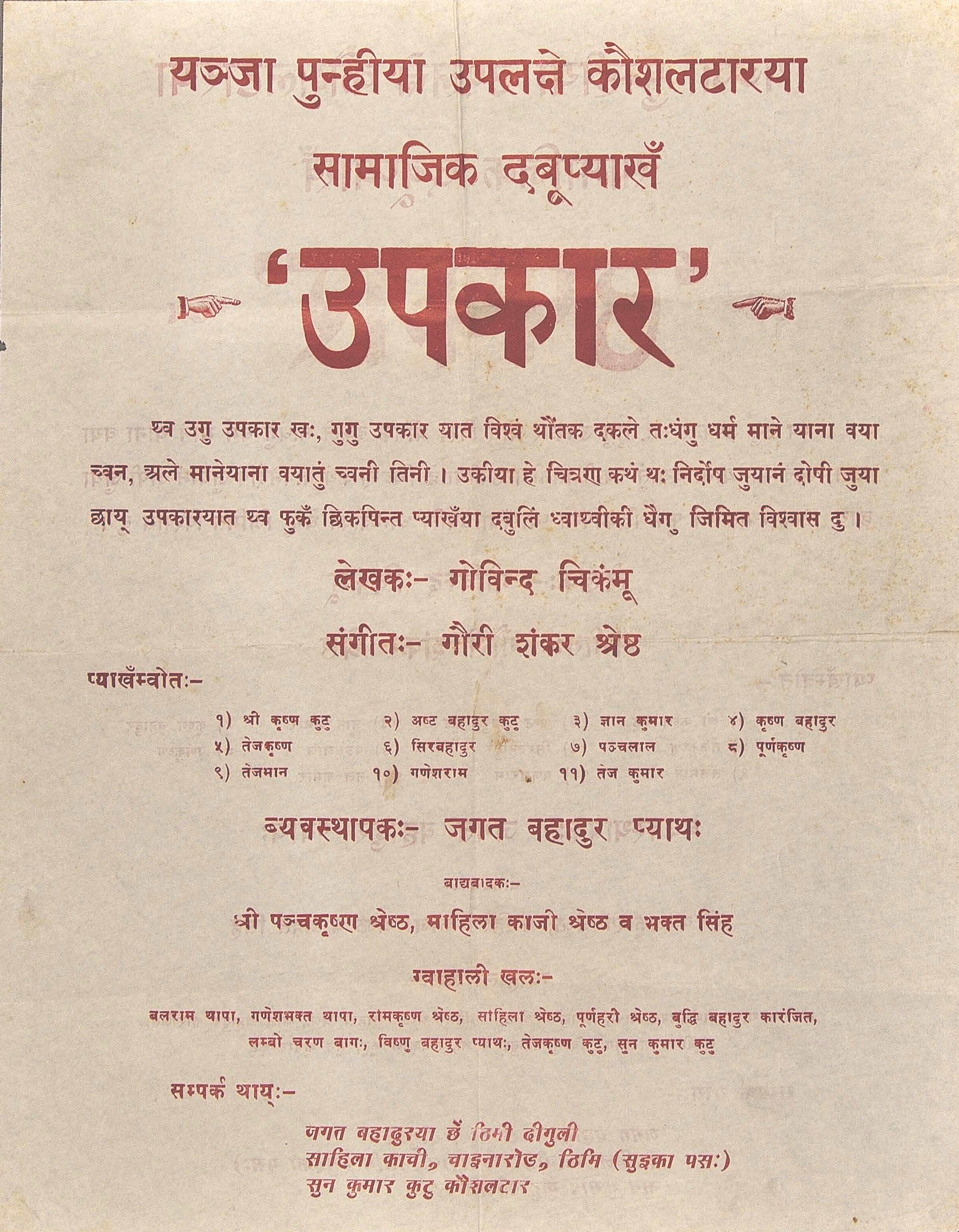
1960s pamphlet advertising street play

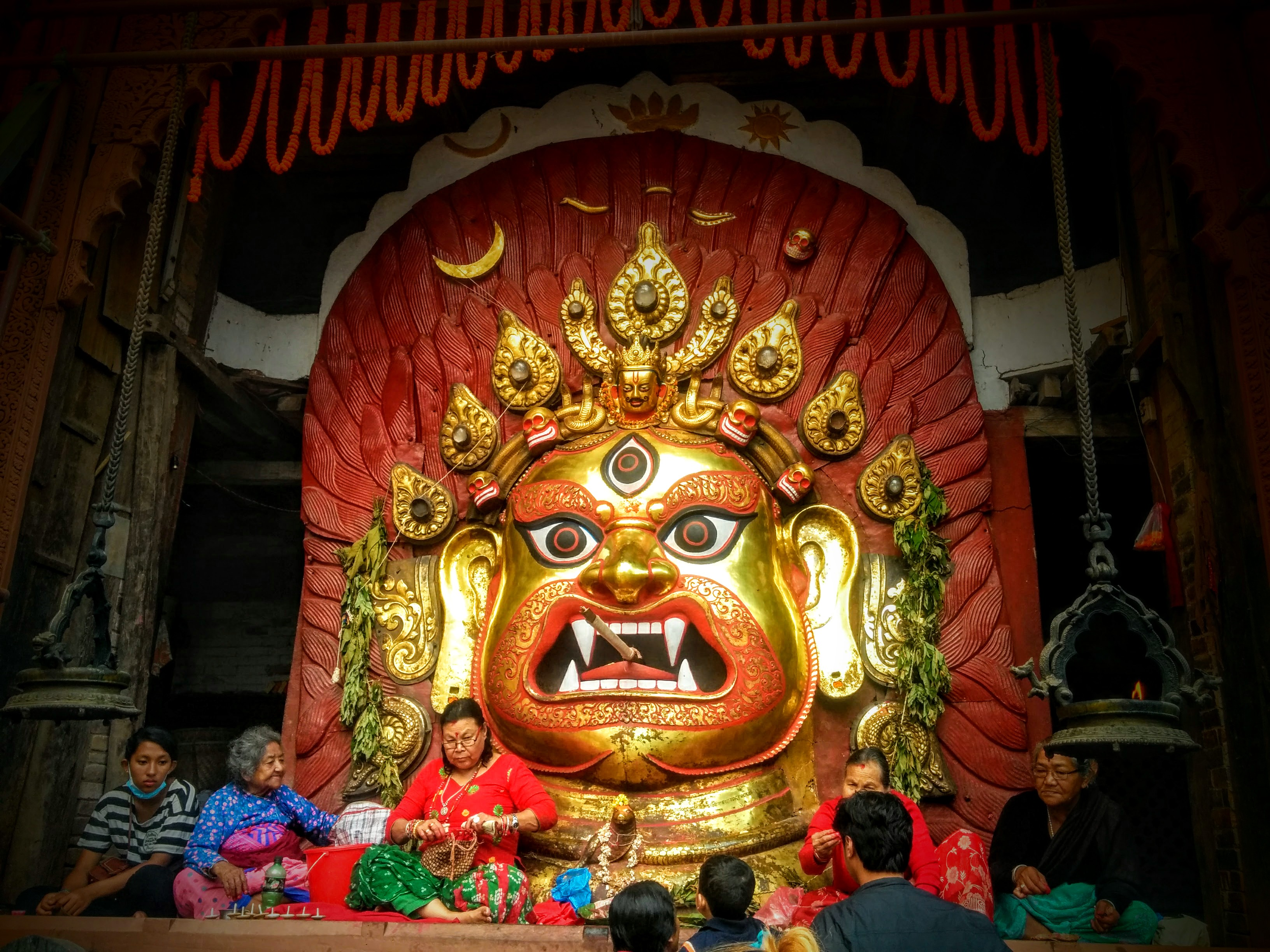
Haatha Daya: Swetha Bhairav

== See also ==
- Bhairab Naach
- Jatra (Nepal)
