= List of bazaars in Nepal =

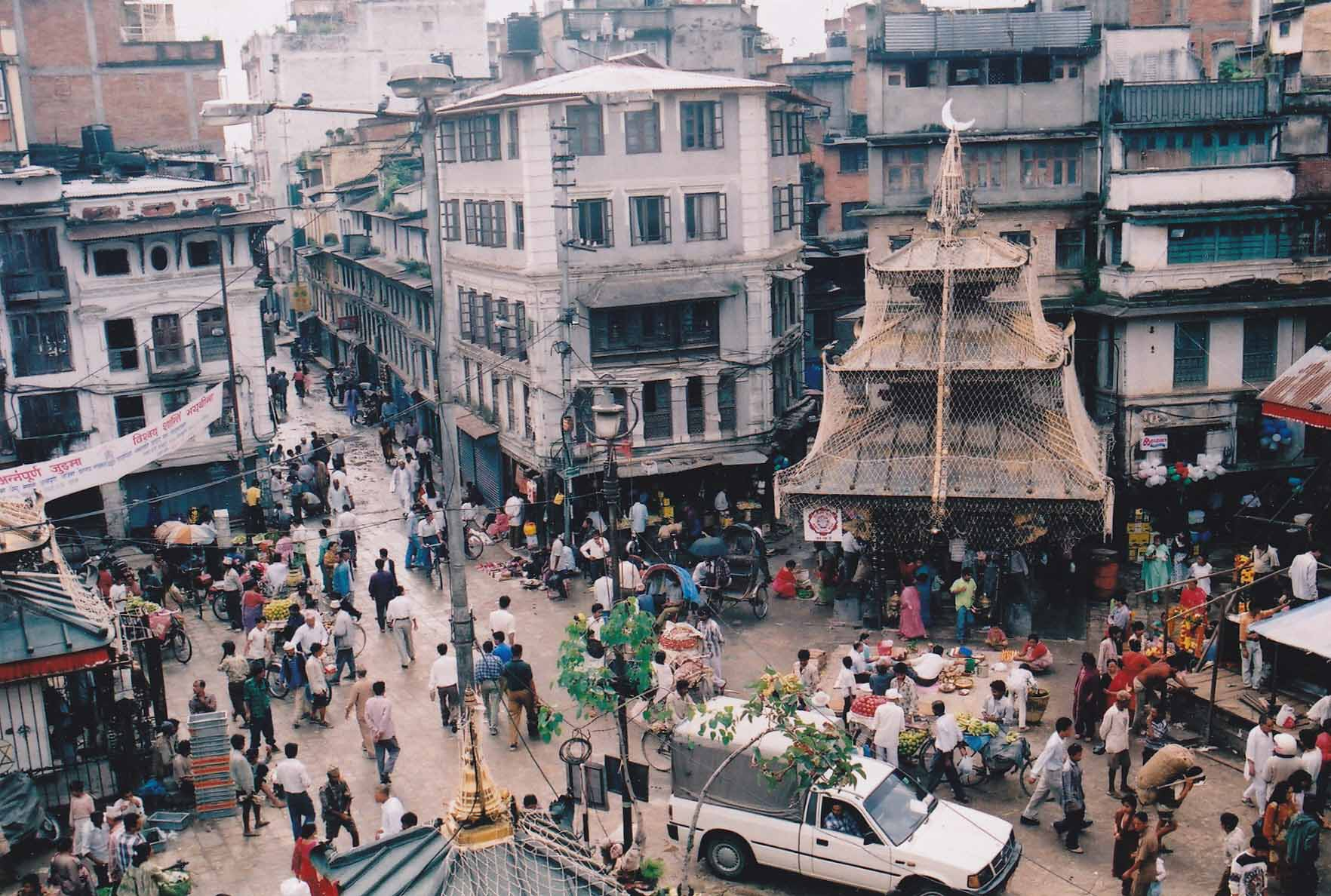
The Asan

A bazaar or souk, is a permanently enclosed marketplace or street where goods and services are exchanged or sold.

The term bazaar originates from the Persian word bāzār. The term bazaar is sometimes also used to refer to the "network of merchants, bankers and craftsmen" who work in that area. Although the word "bazaar" is of Persian origin, its use has spread and now has been accepted into the vernacular in countries around the world.

The term souk (Arabic: سوق suq, Hebrew: שוק shuq, Syriac: ܫܘܩܐ shuqa, Armenian: շուկա shuka, Spanish: zoco, also spelled souq, shuk, shooq, soq, esouk, succ, suk, sooq, suq, soek) is used in Western Asian, North African and some Horn African cities (Amharic: ሱቅ sooq).

== List of Bazaars in Nepal ==
Name	Location	Notes
Asan	Kathmandu	Asan is a ceremonial, market and residential square in central Kathmandu, the capital of Nepal. It is one of the most well-known historical locations in the city and is famed for its bazaar, festival calendar and strategic location. Asan has been described as one of the fine Newar examples of a traditional Asian bazaar. The Tuladhar, Maharjan, Shrestha, Bajracharya and Shakya castes make up most of the population.
Baglung	Kathmandu	Baglung is a municipality in western Nepal, 275 km (171 mi) west of Kathmandu. It is the administrative headquarters of Baglung District and Dhaulagiri Zone. Baglung serves as the major center for business, finance, education, service and healthcare for the people of mid-Kali Gandaki valley that encompass Beni, Jaljala, Baglung, Kushma, Kathekhola, Galkot, Phalewas and Jaimuni local bodies.
Bandipur Rural Municipality	Tanahun District	Bandipur is a hilltop settlement and a municipality in Tanahun District, (Gandaki Zone) of Nepal. This municipality was established on 18 May 2014 by merging with existing Dharampani and Bandipur VDCs. Because of its preserved, old time cultural atmosphere, Bandipur has increasingly been coming to the attention of tourism. At the time of the 2011 Nepal census it had a population of total (Bandipur and Dharampani) 15,591 people living in 3750 individual households. It is one of the best tourist destinations of Nepal. Bandipur is famous for Newari people and their cultures.
Gaushala Bazar	Mahottari district	Gaushala Bazar is the second largest business center in the Mahottari district of Nepal. The animal market of the place is well known. Gaushala is a variation of Goshala, a Sanskrit word that means the shelter home for cows. There is a huge cattle pen named Gaushala containing more than one hundred cows. It is protected by the government of Nepal. The cow is regarded as a sacred animal in Nepal. Hindus considers the cow as mother, and worship the cow as a form of Goddess. Killing cows is illegal in Nepal. Ram Lakhan Chaudhary was Ex-VDC chief of Gaushala Bazar.
Gyaneshwar	Kathmandu	Gyaneshwor is one of the central neighborhoods in the city of Kathmandu, Nepal. It is named after the ancient temple of Gyaneshwor Mahadev & Bhairavsthan located there. It is a multi-cultural residential area with good facilities. Some major establishments located there are the German embassy to Nepal, USEF, Mega Bank, Kaveri Inn, Valley Petrol Station, AT Burger House, Galaxy Public School, Mahendra Bhawan School etc.
Indrachok	Kathmandu	Indrachok is one of the ceremonial and market squares on the artery passing through the historic section of Kathmandu, Nepal. The intersection of Indrachok, along with Maru, Kathmandu Durbar Square, Makhan, Jana Baha, Asan and Naxal, mark the old India-Tibet trade route that is now a vibrant market street.
Kalimati fruit and vegetable market	Kathmandu	Kalimati fruit and vegetable market is the biggest wholesale market for agricultural products in Nepal. It is located in Kathmandu, Nepal. The market is managed and run by the Kalimati Fruit and Vegetable Market Development. The market was established in 1987 as a wholesale center at Kalimati by the Nepal government using United Nation Capital Development Fund with a budget of NPR 4.6 million. The sellers have to sell minimum of five kilograms in the market. There is also a retailing market where small traders can sell their products. There are 425 wholesale, 65 retail and 27 fish shops in the market.
Khaireni	Gulmi	Khaireni is a Bazar at Hasara in Gulmi district. It has a Government Hospital. The nearest School is Shree Satyawati Higher Secondary School.
Maru	Kathmandu	Maru is a historic neighborhood in central Kathmandu, Nepal and one of the most important cultural spots in the city. It is linked with the origin of the name Kathmandu, and forms part of what is generically known as Durbar Square (including Kathmandu Durbar Square, Patan Durbar Square, and Bhaktapur Durbar Square), the old royal palace complexes of temples, shrines and palace buildings all of which have been declared UNESCO World Heritage Sites.
Namche Bazaar	Solukhumbu District	Namche Bazaar (also Nemche Bazaar or Namche Baza; Nepali: नाम्चे बजार) is a town (formally Namche Village Development Committee) in Khumbu Pasanglhamu Rural Municipality in Solukhumbu District of Province No. 1 of north-eastern Nepal. It is located within the Khumbu area at 3,440 metres (11,286 ft) at its low point, populating the sides of a hill. Most Sherpa who are in the tourism business are from the Namche area. Namche is the main trading center and hub for the Khumbu region with many Nepalese officials, a policecheck, post, a bank, and even a beauty salon. At the time of the 2001 Nepal census, it had a population of 1,647 people living in 397 individual households.
