= Lists of neighborhoods by city =

This is a list of lists of neighborhoods in cities around the world. An asterisk indicates a separate article.

== Africa ==
=== South Africa ===
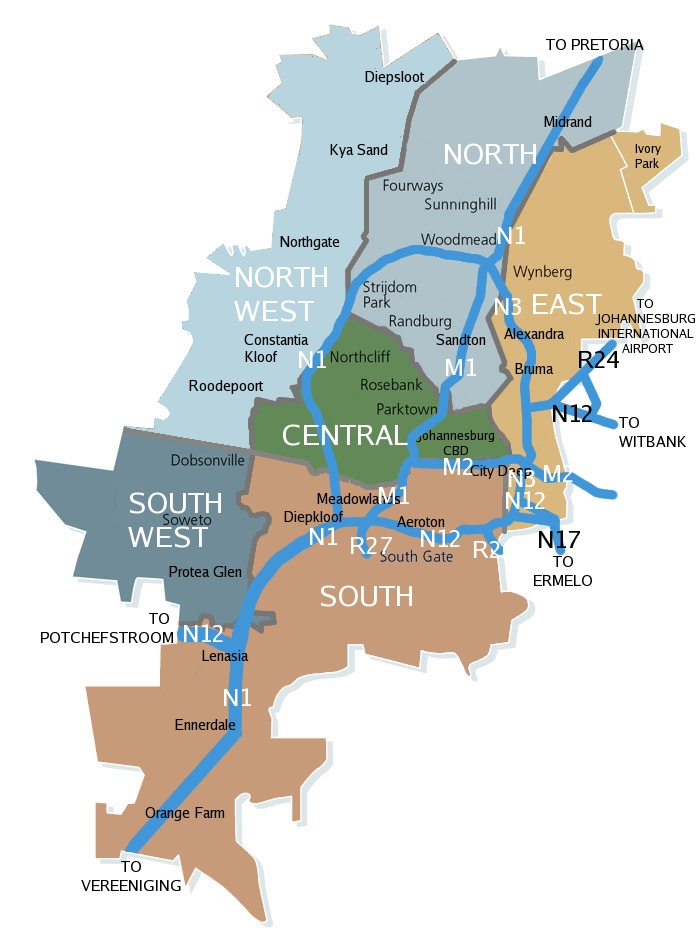
Map of Johannesburg, South Africa

- Cape Town *
- Durban *
- Johannesburg *
- Pretoria *

== Asia ==
=== Bangladesh ===
- Chittagong *
- Dhaka *

=== China ===
- Beijing

==== Hong Kong ====
- Hong Kong *

=== India ===
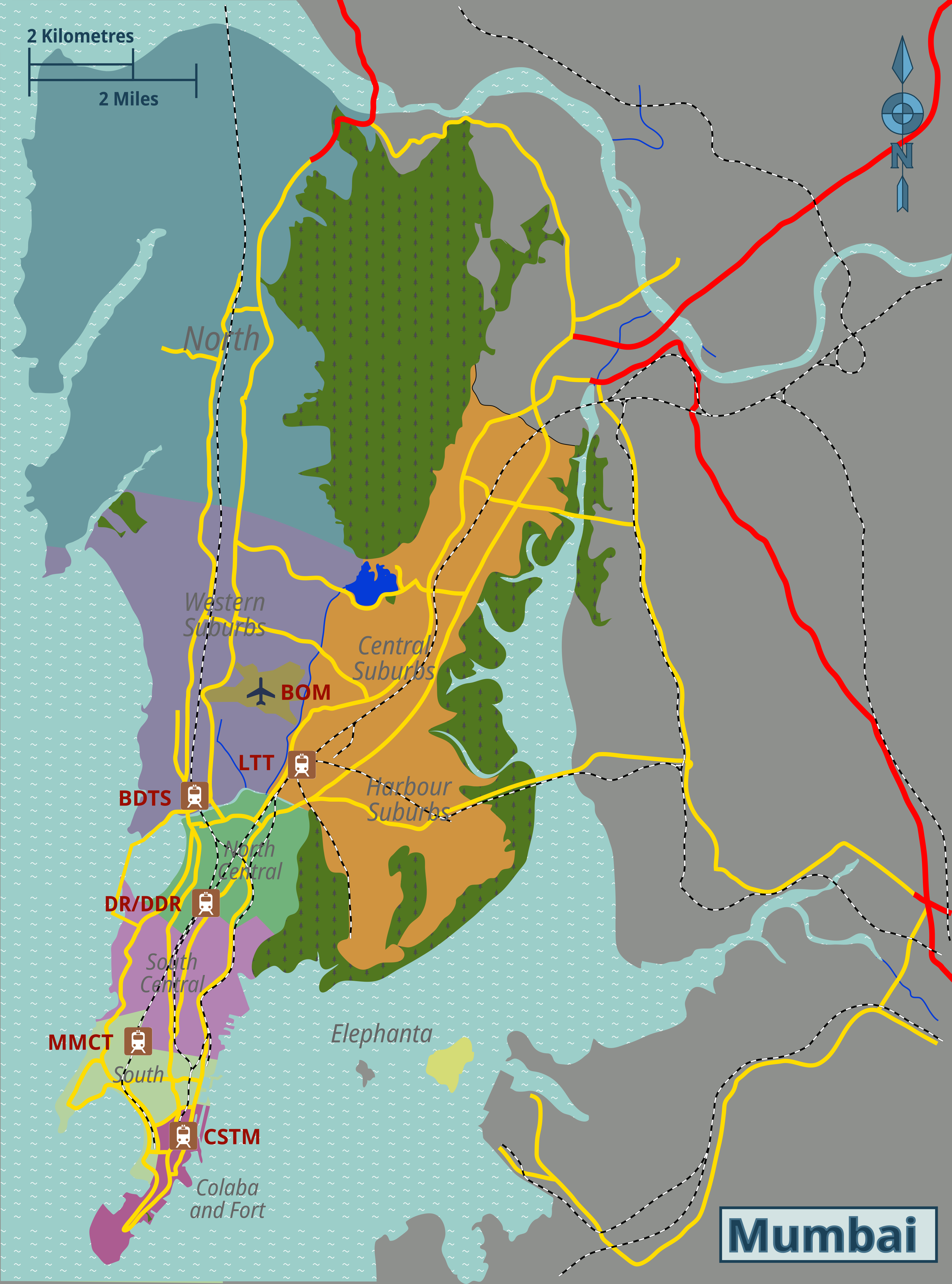
Map of Mumbai, India

- Bangalore *
- Bhubaneswar *
- Chennai *
- Delhi *
- Hyderabad *
- Kochi *
- Kolkata *
- Mumbai *
- Visakhapatnam *

=== Iraq ===
- Baghdad *

=== Israel ===
- Petah Tikva *

=== Japan ===
- Kyoto
- Nara
- Osaka
- Tokyo

=== Nepal ===
- Kathmandu *

=== Philippines ===
- Metro Manila *

=== Saudi Arabia ===
- Mecca *

=== Singapore ===
- Singapore (places) *
- Singapore (subdivisions) *

=== South Korea ===
- Seoul *

== Europe ==
=== Albania ===
- Tirana *

=== Finland ===
- Jyväskylä *

=== Montenegro ===
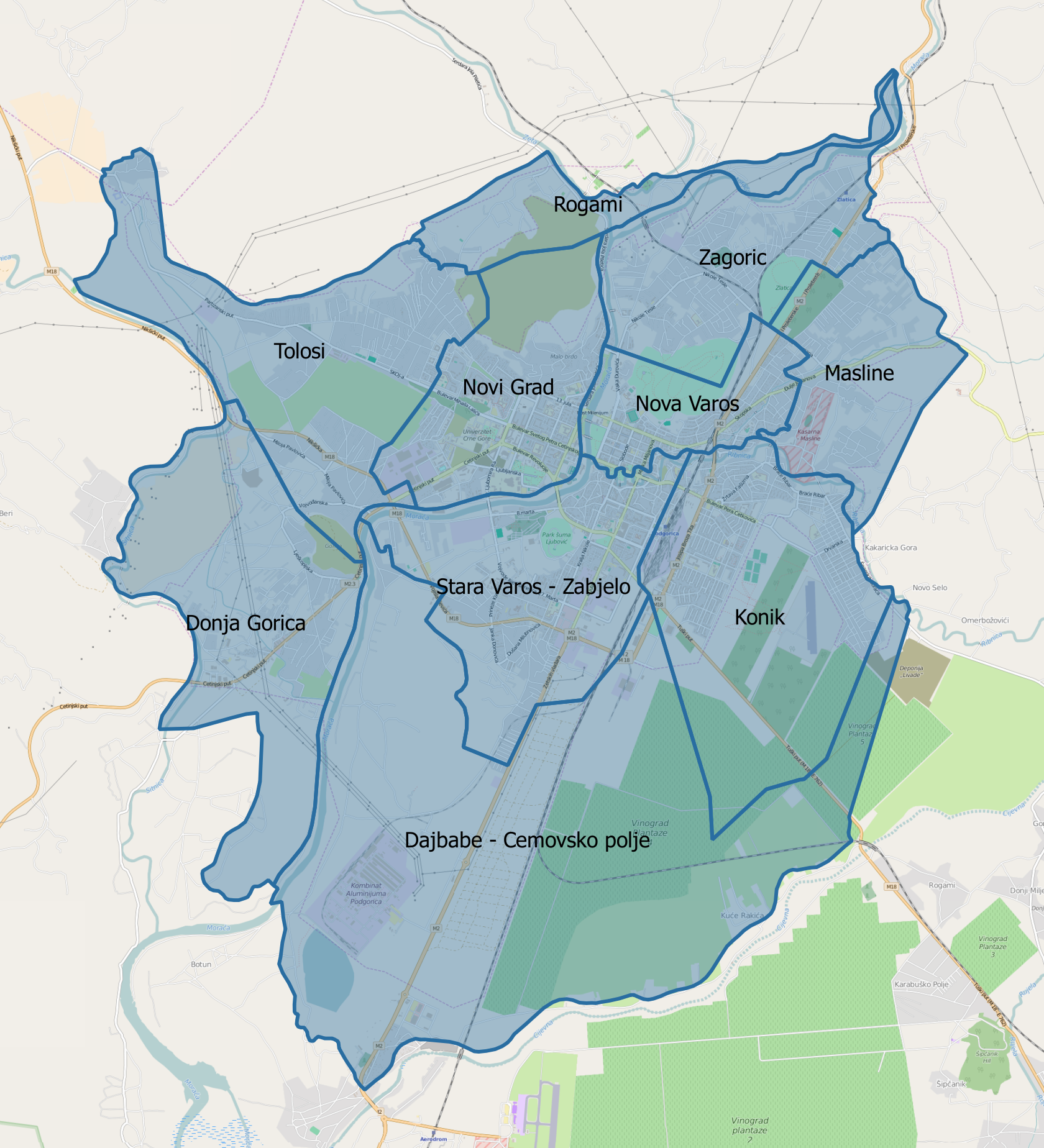
Map of Podgorica, Montenegro

- Podgorica *

=== Poland ===
- Gdańsk *

=== Portugal ===
- Lisbon
- Porto

=== Russia ===
- Moscow (Administrative divisions)
- Saint Petersburg (Administrative divisions)

=== Serbia ===
- Belgrade (neighbourhoods and suburbs)
- Novi Sad (neighborhoods)

=== Spain ===
- Alicante
- Barcelona
- Bilbao
- Córdoba
- Granada
- Madrid
- Málaga
- Murcia
- Palma de Mallorca
- Seville
- Valencia
- Valladolid
- Vigo
- Zaragoza

=== United Kingdom ===
- London *
  - Barking and Dagenham *
  - Barnet *
  - Bexley *
  - Brent *
  - Bromley *
  - Camden *
  - Croydon *
  - Ealing *
  - Enfield *
  - Greenwich *
  - Hackney *
  - Hammersmith and Fulham *
  - Haringey *
  - Harrow *
  - Havering *
  - Hillingdon *
  - Hounslow *
  - Islington *
  - Kensington and Chelsea *
  - Kingston upon Thames *
  - Lambeth *
  - Lewisham *
  - Merton *
  - Newham *
  - Redbridge *
  - Richmond upon Thames
  - Southwark
  - Sutton *
  - Tower Hamlets *
  - Waltham Forest *
  - Wandsworth *
  - Westminster *
- Bristol *
- Manchester *
- Scotland*

=== Ukraine ===
- Kyiv *

== North America ==
=== Canada ===
- Toronto *
  - East York
  - Etobicoke
  - North York
  - Scarborough
  - York
- Montreal *
- Ottawa *
- Vancouver *

=== United States ===
Map of Boston, Massachusetts, U.S.

Sorted alphabetically by state or district for navigability purposes.

- Birmingham, Alabama *
- Phoenix, Arizona
- Berkeley, California *
- Burbank, California
- Calabasas, California
- Long Beach, California *
- Los Angeles, California *
- San Diego, California *
- San Francisco, California *
- Oakland, California
- Washington D.C *
- Wilmington, Delaware
- Miami, Florida *
- Tampa, Florida *
- Columbus, Georgia *
- Honolulu, Hawaii
- Chicago, Illinois
  - Community areas of Chicago *
  - Neighborhoods of Chicago *
- Moline, Illinois
- Indianapolis, Indiana *
- Louisville, Kentucky *
- New Orleans, Louisiana *
- Portland, Maine *
- Baltimore, Maryland *
- Boston, Massachusetts *
- Worcester, Massachusetts *
- Detroit, Michigan *
- Duluth, Minnesota *
- Minneapolis, Minnesota *
- Saint Paul, Minnesota *
- St. Louis, Missouri *
- Billings, Montana *
- Omaha, Nebraska *
- Buffalo, New York
- New York City, New York *
  - Bronx *
  - Brooklyn *
  - Manhattan *
  - Queens *
  - Staten Island *
- Syracuse, New York
- Elizabeth, New Jersey
- Jersey City, New Jersey
- Newark, New Jersey *
- Charlotte, North Carolina *
- Greensboro, North Carolina *
- Raleigh, North Carolina
- Cincinnati, Ohio *
- Cleveland, Ohio
- Columbus, Ohio *
- Portland, Oregon *
- Harrisburg, Pennsylvania *
- Philadelphia, Pennsylvania *
- Pittsburgh, Pennsylvania *
- Memphis, Tennessee *
- Austin, Texas *
- Dallas, Texas *
- Fort Worth, Texas *
- Houston, Texas *
- San Antonio, Texas *
- Richmond, Virginia *
- Seattle, Washington *
- Milwaukee, Wisconsin *

== South America ==
=== Argentina ===
- Buenos Aires (Barrios) *

=== Brazil ===
- São Paulo *
- Porto Alegre *

=== Uruguay ===
- Montevideo *

== Oceania ==
=== Australia ===
Map of Canberra, Australia

- Sydney *
- Melbourne *
- Brisbane *
- Perth *
- Adelaide *
- Gold Coast *
- Newcastle *
- Canberra *
- Wollongong *
- Hobart *
- Townsville *
- Darwin *

=== New Zealand ===
- Auckland *
- Dunedin *

== See also ==
- List of administrative divisions by country
- Gay village
- List of named ethnic enclaves in North American cities
