= SAAF School Cricket Series =

- Countries: Nepal
- Administrator: Student Athletic Activities Foundation
- Format: Twenty20
- First edition: 2014
- Latest edition: 2019
- Tournament format: Round robin, followed by playoffs

The SAAF School Cricket Series is an annual high school cricket championship organized by the Student Athletic Activities Foundation (SAAF) in Nepal. It is played under the Twenty20 variant of limited overs cricket.

== History ==
The inaugural event of the SAAF School Cricket Series was staged in Kathmandu from 31 December 2014 to 7 January 2015 with eight high school cricket teams from seven high schools. The event was titled WAI WAI School Cricket Series 2014 after the main sponsor of the championship. Out of the 20 matches, 16 were played at Sainik Awasiya Mahavidyalaya Ground, Bhaktapur and 4 were played at Engineering Campus Ground, Lalitpur.

== Format ==
Eight teams are divided into two, four-team, pools. Each pool plays a round-robin format. The top two teams from each pool compete in the first place playoffs to determine the teams finishing in the top four positions. The bottom two teams from each pool are relegated to the fifth place playoffs.

== Teams ==
Team	School	Captain
Everest Burners	Mount Everest School	Sushil Kunwar
Galaxy Jaguars	Galaxy Public School	Bamdev Singh Jagari
DAV Kiwis	DAVSKVB School	Sujal Gupta
Police Ncops	Nepal Police School	Suraj Chaudhary
KINS Rhinos	Kathmandu International School	Udit Khanal
Sainik Seals	Sainik Awasiya Mahavidyalaya	Bishal Budhathoki
Sainik Sharks	Sainik Awasiya Mahavidyalaya	Bhuwan Sapkota
Rajan Warriors	Rajan Memorial School	Prabesh Panta

== Championship Titles ==
Year	Title	Final Venue	Final		
Year	Title	Final Venue	Winner	Result	Runner-up
2014	WAI WAI School Cricket Series 2014	Engineering Campus Ground, Lalitpur	Sainik Sharks; 47/0 (4.0 overs)	Sharks won by 10 wickets Scorecard	Police Ncops; 46 all out (15.2 overs)
2015	School Cricket Series 2015				

== Statistics ==
=== 2014 ===
Overall records	Player	Team	Statistic
Most Runs	Bishnu Kumal	Sainik Sharks	203 runs
Most Wickets	Mandip Bhandari; Sudip Khadka	Sainik Sharks; Sainik Seals	13 wickets 13 wickets
