= Greensboro neighborhoods =

The following is a list of neighborhoods, districts, and other places located in the city of Greensboro, North Carolina. The list is organized by broad geographical section within the city. While there is no official list of neighborhoods, districts, and places, this list was compiled from the sources listed in the External links section, as well as from information compiled from residents of Greensboro.

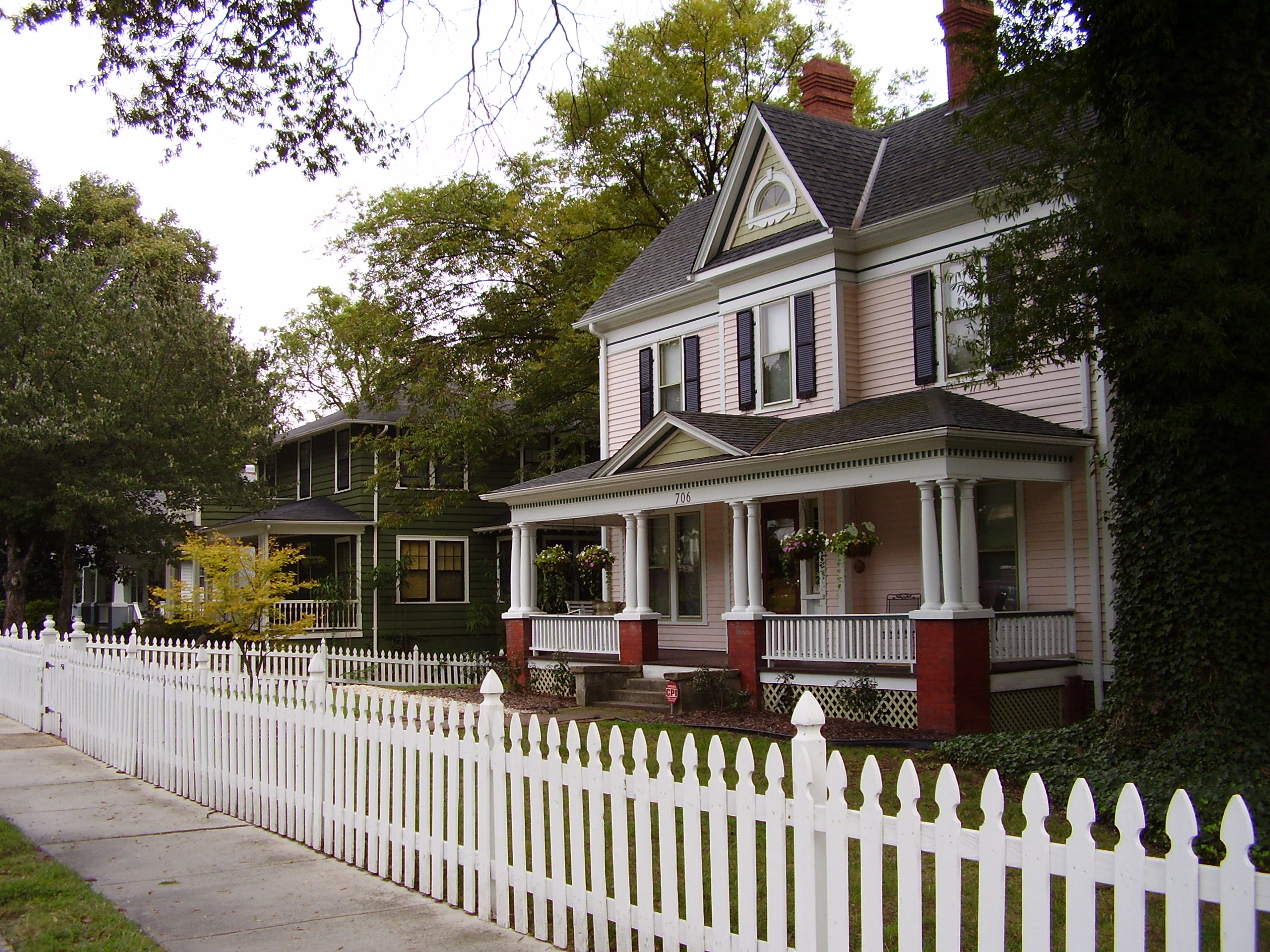
Aycock Historic District

Greensboro's neighborhoods have no "official" borders, such that some of the places listed below may overlap geographically, and residents are not always in agreement with where one neighborhood ends and another begins.

Historically, many neighborhoods were defined by platted subdivisions. Others were originally villages before being incorporated as part of the city. Still more complicated is the fact that in some parts of Greensboro, especially the central areas of East and South Greensboro, residents have long been more likely to identify with the name of their section of the city than with any specific neighborhood name. Today, community-based organizations, homeowner's associations, neighborhood watches, and other civic organizations are an influential force in shaping the use of neighborhood names and approximate boundaries.

== North Greensboro ==
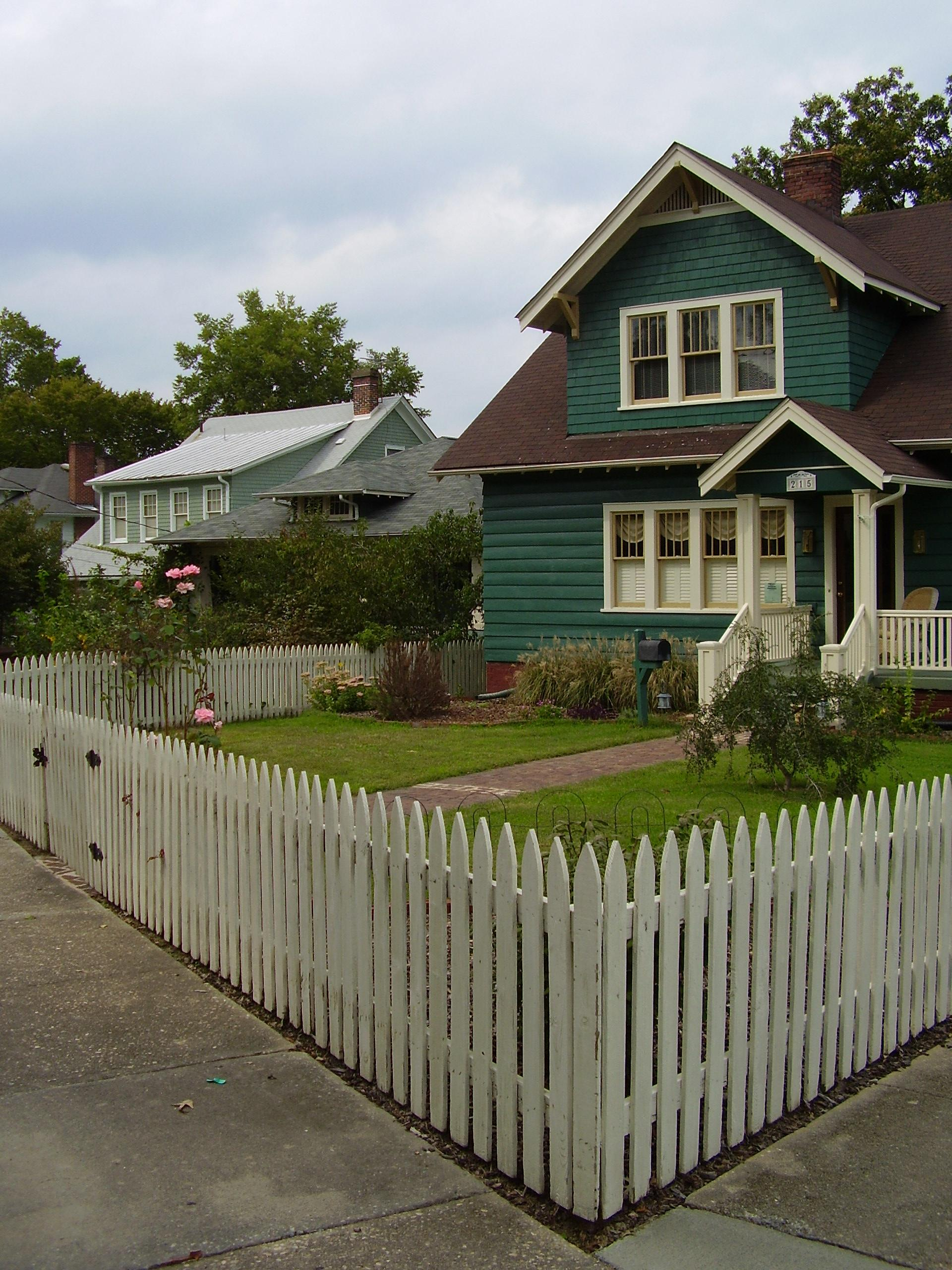
Fisher Park Historic District

- Fisher Park Breadth: North to Wendover Avenue, East to the Southern Railway, South to Smith Street, East to Wharton Street.
- Lake Jeanette
- Latham Park
- Irving Park
- New Irving Park
- Bur-Mil Park
- Kirkwood

== East Greensboro ==
- Aycock
- Bessemer
- Dudley Heights
- Old L. Richardson
- East White Oaks, Greensboro, North Carolina
- White Oak New Town
- Willow Oaks
- Little Mexico
- Benbow Park
- Clinton Hills(Heights)

== South Greensboro ==
- Adams Farm
- Asheboro Square
- Grandover
- Ole Asheboro
- Sedgefield Breadth: North to Gate City Boulevard, East to Groomtown Road, South to Rockingham Road, East, West to Guilford College Road.
- Southside Greensboro, North Carolina-Randleman Rd., Holden Rd., W. Florida St., S. Elm Eugene St., (Smith Homes, Hampton Homes, Parkside, J.T. Hariston Homes, Terrell Street Apts., Wynnmere)

== West Greensboro ==
- Carriage Hills
- College Hill Breadth: North to West Market Street, East to Spring Street, South to the Southern Railroad, West to McIver Street.
- Friendly Homes
- Glenwood Breadth: North to West Gate City Boulevard, East to Freeman Mill Road, West to Coliseum Boulevard.
- Green Valley
- Hamilton Lakes
- Jefferson Woods
- Lindley Park
- Starmount
- Starmount Forest
- Wedgewood
- Sunset Hills
- The Cardinal
- Guilford College
- Westerwood
- Lake Daniel
- Friendswood
