= List of neighborhoods of Petah Tikva =

Petah Tikva includes more than 33 neighborhoods. These include:

- Ahim Israelit (אחים ישראלית)
- Amishav (עמישב)
- Bar Yehuda (בר יהודה)
- Bat Ganim (בת גנים)
- Beilinson (בלינסון)
- City Center (מרכז העיר)
- Ein Ganim (עין גנים)
- Hadar Ganim (הדר גנים)
- Hadar HaMoshavot (הדר המושבות)
- Kfar Avraham (כפר אברהם)
- Kfar Ganim (כפר גנים)
- Kiryat David Elazar (קרית דוד אליעזר)
- Kiryat Alon (known previously as Fajja and Neve Kibush) (קרית אלון)
- Kiryat Aryeh Industrial Zone (אזור תעשיה קרית אלון)
- Kiryat Eliezer Perry (קרית אליעזר פרי)
- Kiryat HaRav Solomon (קרית הרב סולומון)
- Kiryat Matalon (קרית מטלון)
- Krol (קרול)
- Mishkanot Ganim (משכנות גנים)
- Neve Gan (נוה גן)
- Neve Ganim (נוה גנים)
- Neve Oz (נוה עוז)
- New Neve Oz (נווה עוז החדשה)
- New Hadar HaMoshavot (הדר מושבות החדש)
- Ramat Siv Industrial Zone (אזור תעשיה רמת זיו)
- Ramat Verber (רמת ורבר)
- Sgula Industrial Zone (אזור תעשיה סגולה)
- Sha'ariya (שעריה)
- Shifer (שיפר)
- Shikun Ahdut (שיכון אחדות)
- Shikun HaPo'el HaMizrahi (שיכון הפועל המזרחי)
- Tkuma (תקומה)
- Tzameret Ganim (צמרת גנים)
- Yoseftal (יוספטל)
