= Asan, Kathmandu =

Marketplaces in central Kathmandu

Coordinates: 27°42′27″N 85°18′44″E

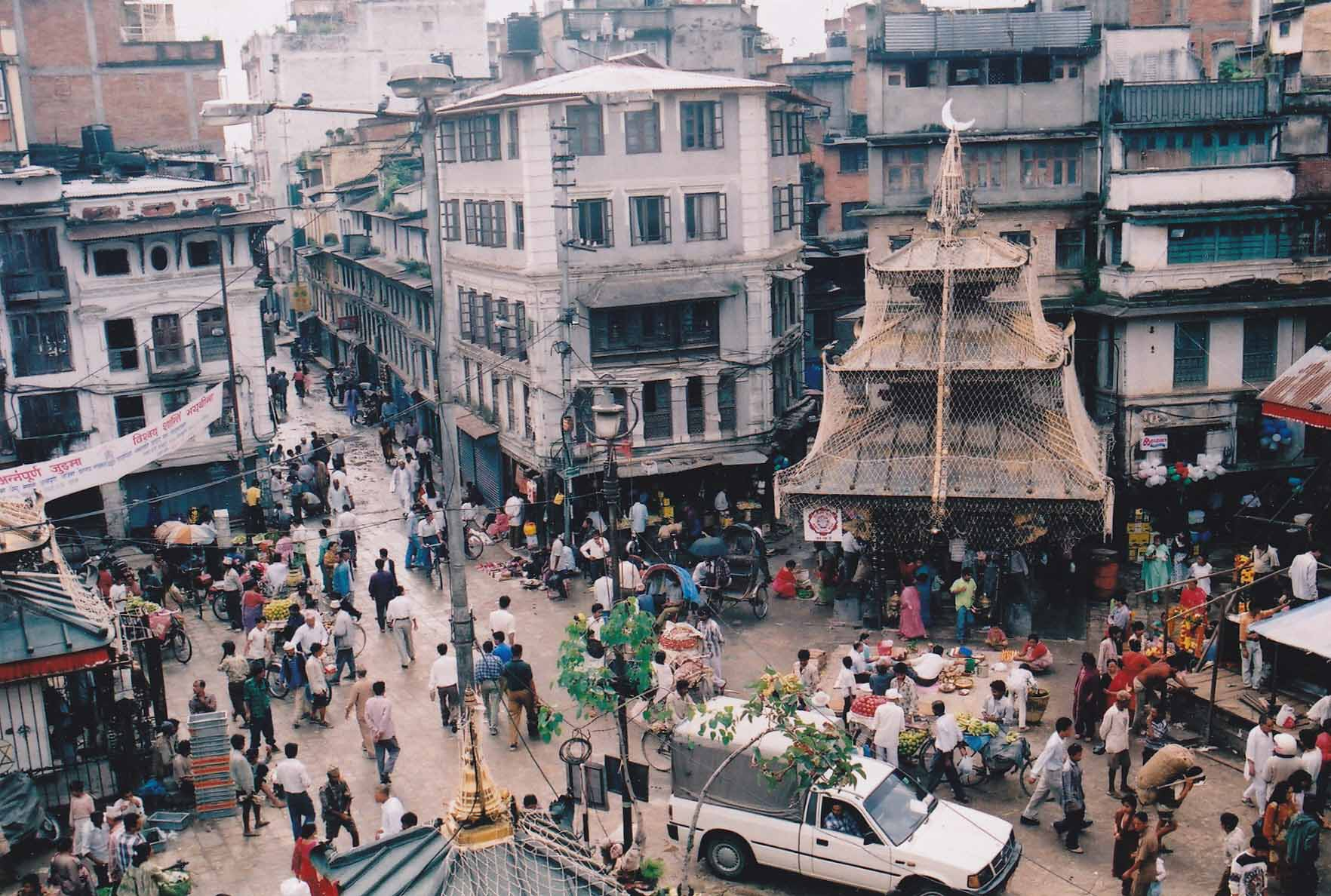
Rooftop view of Ason

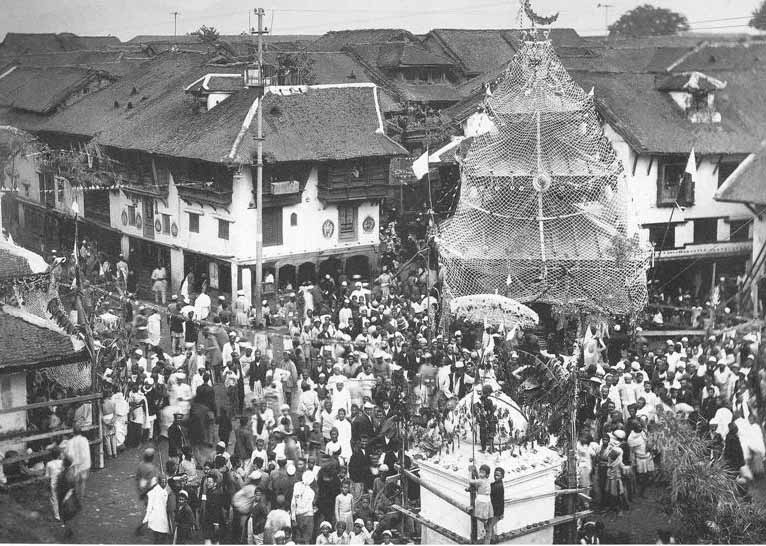
Asan in 1920

360° view of Asan Tol in 2017

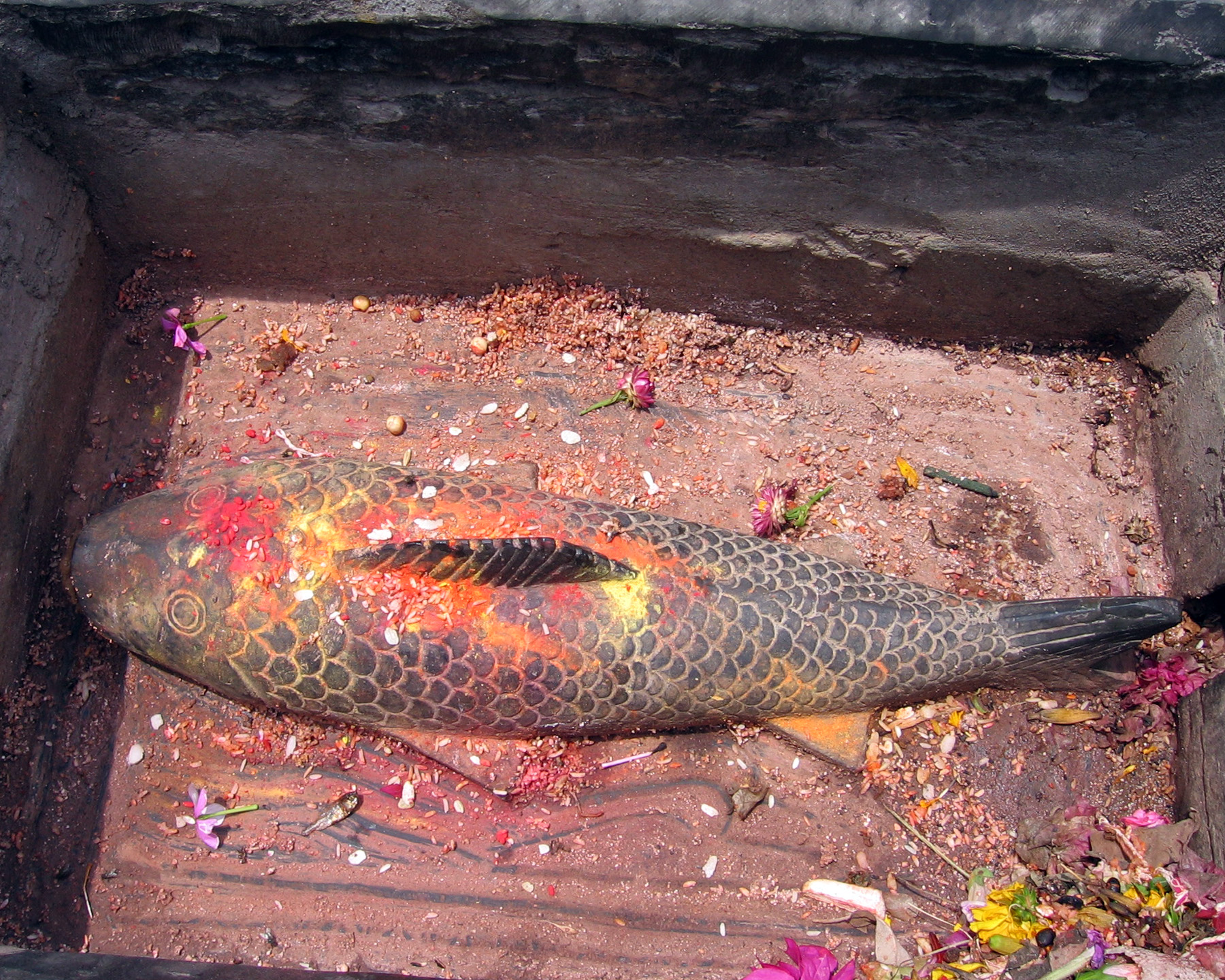
Stone fish

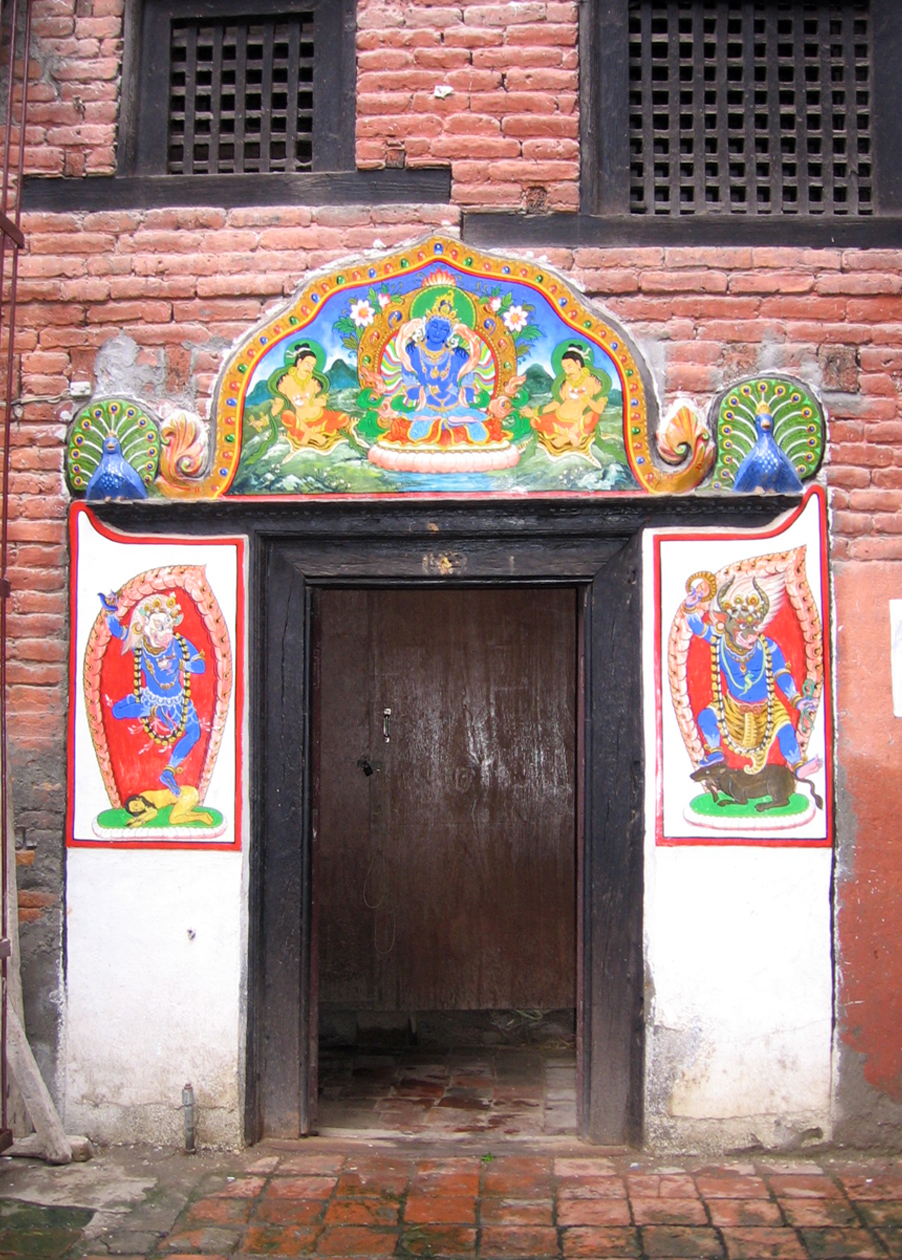
Doorway at Taktse Baha

Map

Asan (Newar: असं; Nepali: असन, pronounced [ʌsʌn]) (alternative names: Asan Tol असन टोल [ʌsʌn ʈol], Asan Twāh असं त्वाः) is a ceremonial, market and residential square in central Kathmandu, the capital of Nepal. It is one of the most well-known historical locations in the city and is famed for its bazaar, festival calendar and strategic location. Asan has been described as a fine Newar example of a traditional Asian bazaar. The Tuladhar, Maharjan, Shrestha, Bajracharya and Shakya castes make up most of the population.

Six streets converge in Asan, giving the square a perpetual bustle. The bazaar in Asan attracts shoppers from all over Kathmandu because of the vast variety of merchandise sold here, ranging from foodstuffs, spices and textiles to electronics and bullion.

Asan is also one of the popular tourist spots in the city because of its architectural sights and ambience. There are banks, restaurants and a post office. Two taxi stands and bus stops are situated on the eastern side.

== History ==
Asan straddles one of the two legendary India-Tibet trade routes that pass through Kathmandu. Because of this history, Asan has been one of the city's main marketplaces since ancient times. The trade route is diagonally aligned, and the section within the city extends from Kathmandu Durbar Square to Asan and to the northeast.

== Highlights ==
- The temple of Annapurna Ajimā (alternative name: Asanmaru Ajimā असंमरु अजिमा) presides over Asan. She is the goddess of abundant food grain and is the patron deity of the neighborhood. The goddess is represented by a filled grain measure.
- A temple of Ganesh (alternative name Ganedya गनेद्य:) stands at the northern side of the square. The temple was renovated and its tile roofs were replaced in 1928. Every traditional Newar neighborhood has a Ganesh shrine.
- Nyālon (न्यालोहं) meaning "fish stone" is the stone figure of a fish placed on a pedestal at the center of the square. It marks the spot where a fish fell from the sky and is related to the legendary founding of Asan.
- A small temple dedicated to the deity Narayan stands at the northwestern side of the square.
- Yita Chapā (यिता चपा:) meaning "southern pavilion" is the long building on the southern side. It contains shrine rooms and a hymn hall where locals gather to sing hymns.
- Asan Dabu is a stone platform where sacred dances and musical performances are held during festivals. At other times it is covered by shops.
- The streets and lanes radiating out from the square contain shrines and sacred courtyards. The Buddhist courtyards of Takse Bāhā, Kwathu Bāhā, Hāku Bāhā, Dhālāsikwa Bāhā, Dagu Bāhā, Asan Bāhā and Hwakhā Bāhā are situated around the perimeter of the square. Each of them contains a decorated shrine house with an image of the Buddha and assorted stupas.

== Festivals ==
Asan is a cultural and religious center and is the venue for a number of festivals and processions.

- Asan: Chālan (असं: चाल the day after Vijaya Dashami) is one of the biggest festivals of Asan, which means the main day of Dashain for the Newar people of Asan (especially Maharjan Community). They celebrate the Tika ceremony and a KUMA NAKIGU (कुम नकेगु) worshiping the selected child as a children of Annapurna Ajimā from Maharjan community of Asan: (असं: िकसन means farmer of asan:). Later at night, The palanquin of Hindu deity Annapurna Ajimā (Annapurna Jatra started) carried from Asan to Thahity, Jyatha, Balkumari and rest at Bhotahity (home of Annapurna Ajimā ) for a whole night. It is held in October.
- Annapurna Jatra On the second day of the chariot festival of Annapurna Ajimā, It continued where it rested (Bhotahity). An Idol of the goddess Asanbhalu Annapurna Ajimā, the patron deity of Asan, is placed on a palanquin and carried around town Thaneyā (थनेया:) to Koneyā (कॊनेया:) accompanied by Newar musical bands for a whole day . Then it returns where it belong (Asan). The procession is held in October,.
- Dyah Lwākegu (द्य: ल्वाकेगु) is one of the most important festivals of Asan. Three portable shrines containing the images of goddesses from Wotu, Tebahal and Kanga are brought to Asan for a celebration. It takes place on the second day of the Pahan Charhe (पाहां चह्रे) festival in April.
- Jana Baha Dyah Jatra (जनबहाः द्यः जात्रा) is the chariot festival of Aryavalokitesvara (Sacred Avalokiteśvara), a Buddhist deity popularly known as Jana Baha Dyah or White Machhendranath (alternative name: White Karunamaya). The chariot makes an overnight halt at Asan from where it is pulled to the next stop at Durbar Square. Devotees light butter lamps all over the square to honor the deity. The procession is held in April.
- On the second day of the chariot festival of Kumāri Jātrā, three chariots containing human representation of Ganesh, Bhairava and Kumari are pulled through Asan. The chariot procession is part of Indra Jatra and is known as Thaneyā (थनेया:). It is held in September.

== Musical societies ==
Asan Kisan Bājan Khala (Newar: असं िकसन बाजं खल: Maharjan Community) plays devotional music at Asan during festivals such as at Dashain, Bhintuna (mha puja at tihar), Jyapu Diwas (Yo mori Punhi), Jana Baha Dyah Jatra (जनबहाः द्यः जात्रा Chaitya Dashain). Asan Bājan Khala (Tuladhar Community) also plays the music at asan during dashain festival. Its members also make daily pilgrimages to Swayambhu in the early morning playing Gunla Bajan music during the holy month of Gunla (around August). Annapurna Gyānmala Bhajan Khala is the neighborhood society of hymn singers.

== Gallery ==
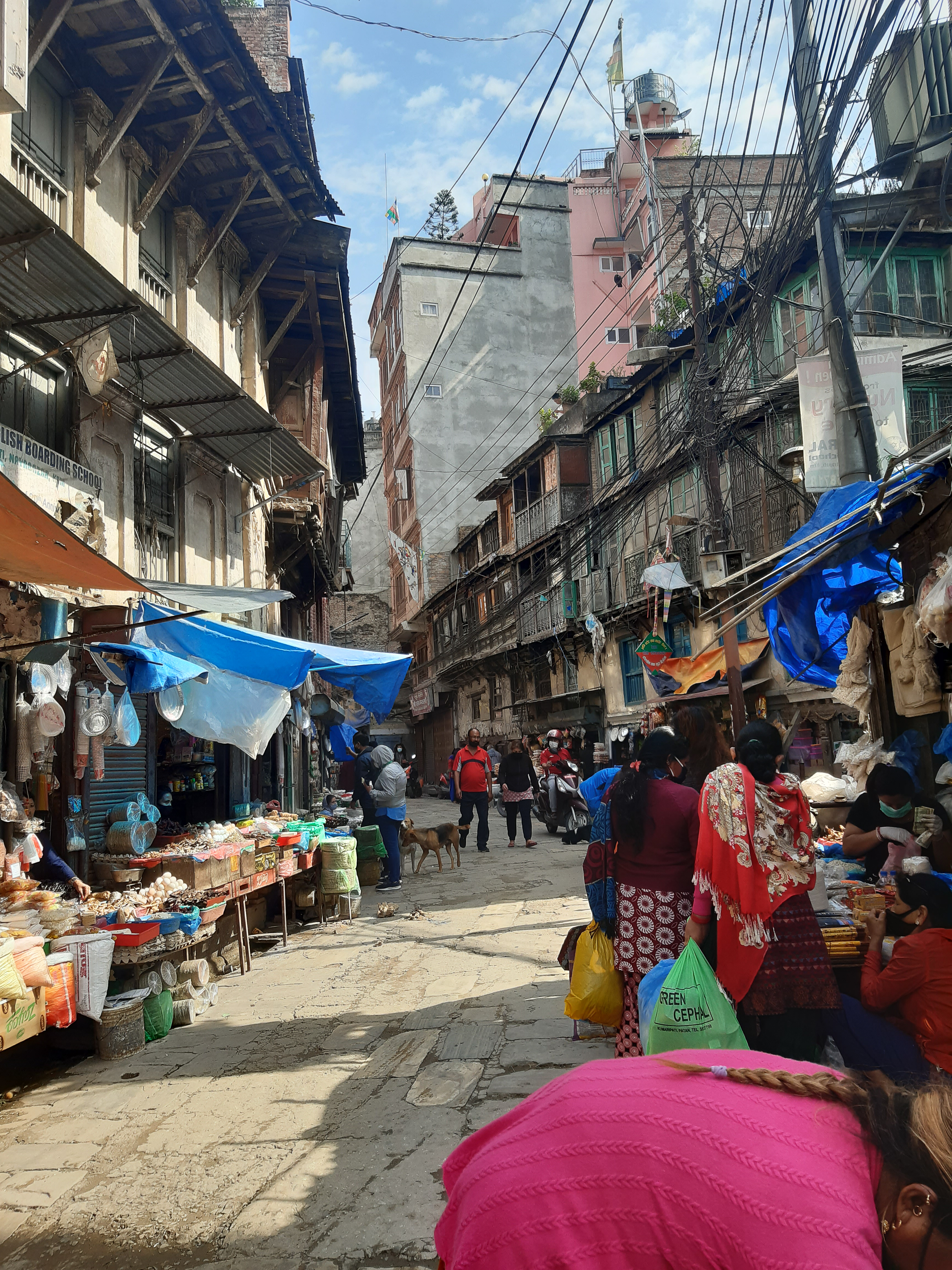
The vegetable market of Ason, Kathmandu

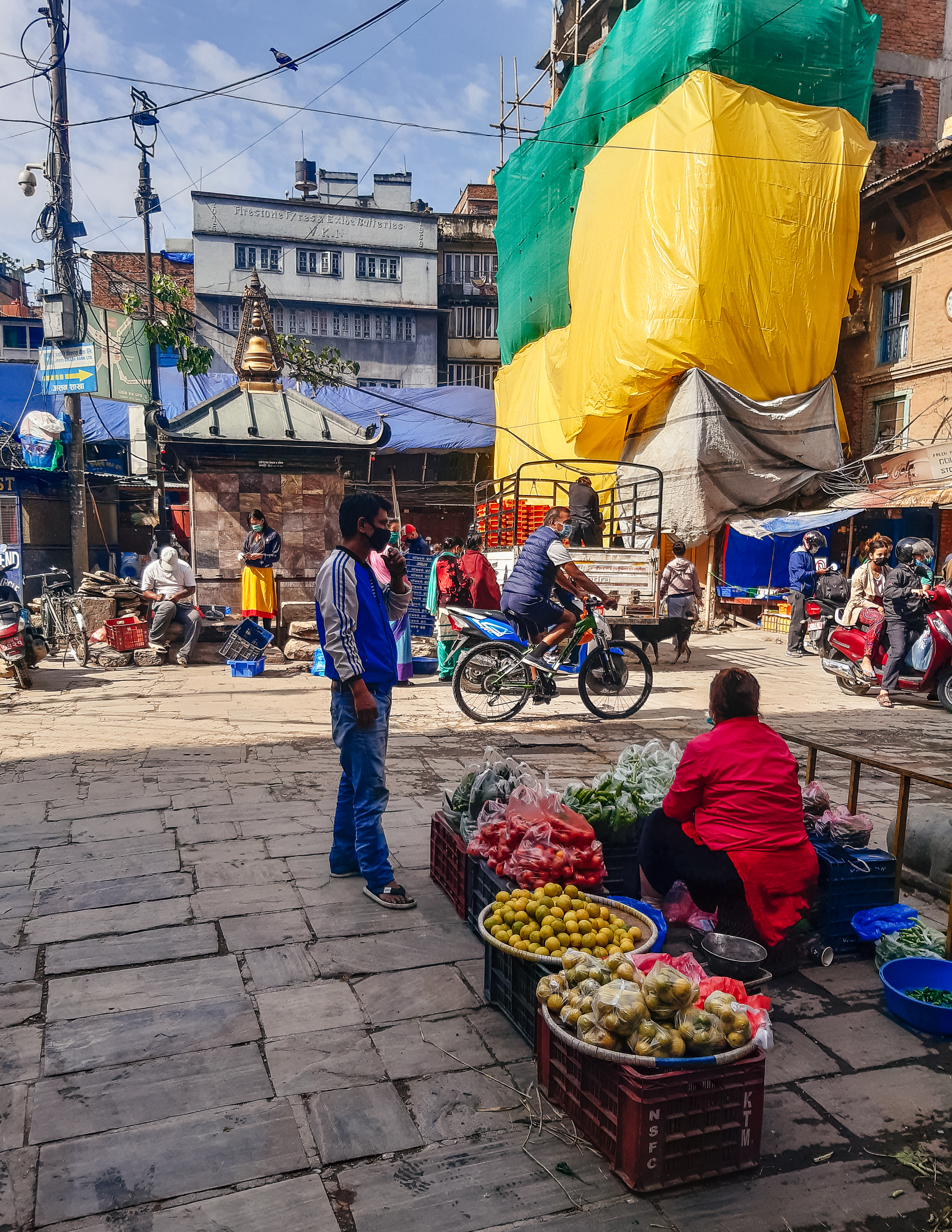
Fruits vendor in Ason, Kathmandu

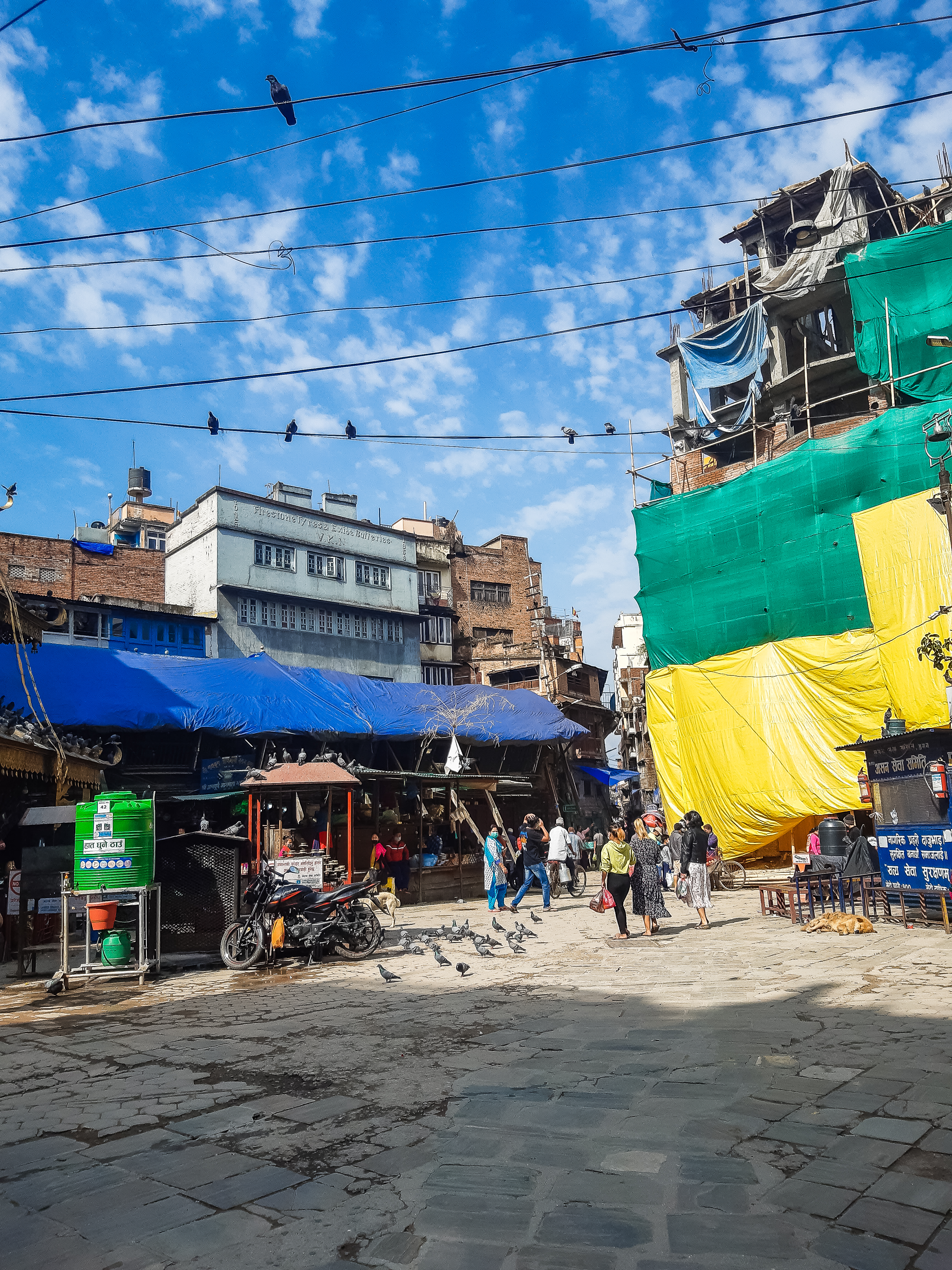
The main street of Ason, Kathmandu

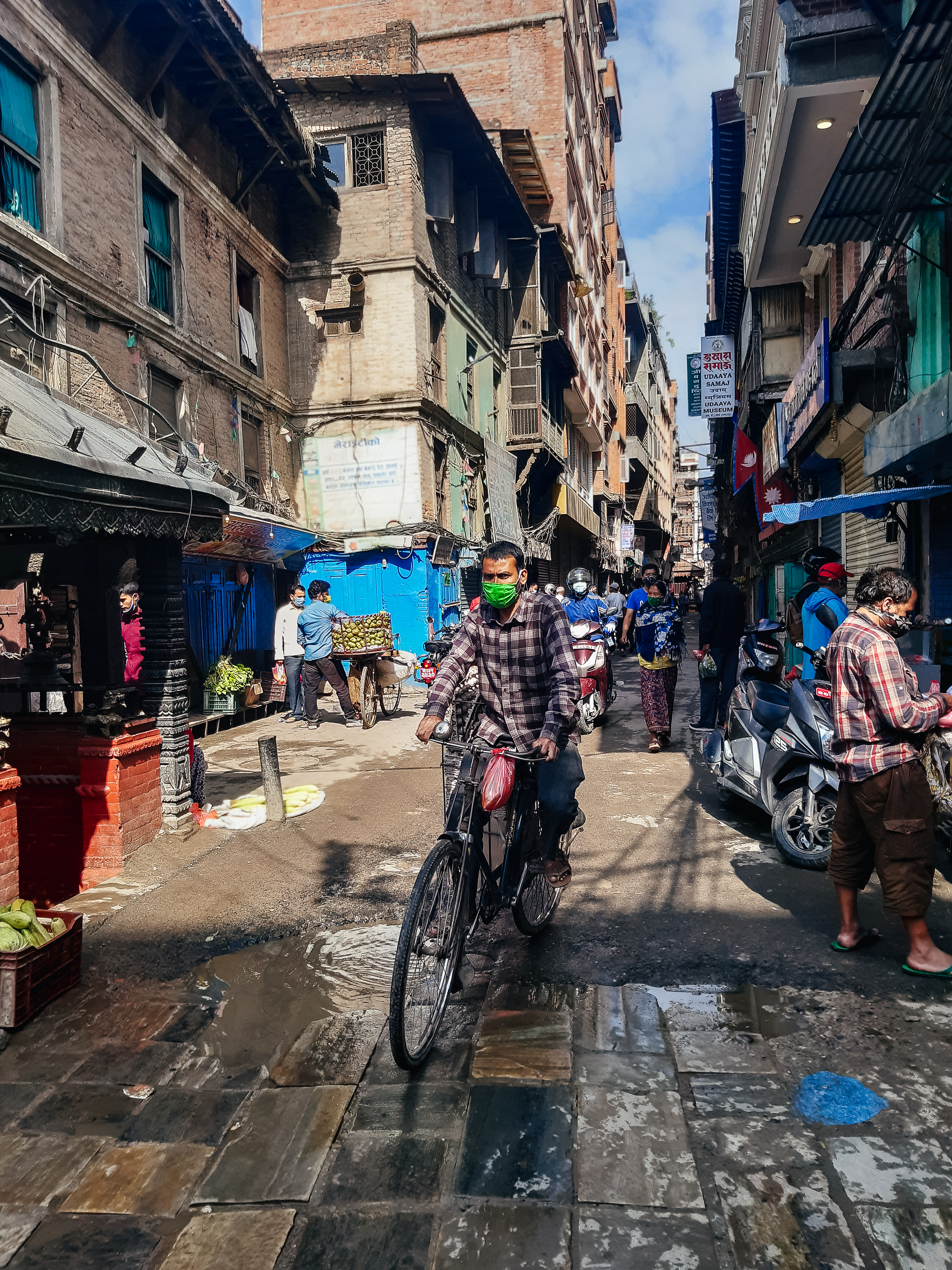
Man riding bicycle during the lockdown on the streets of Ason, Nepal

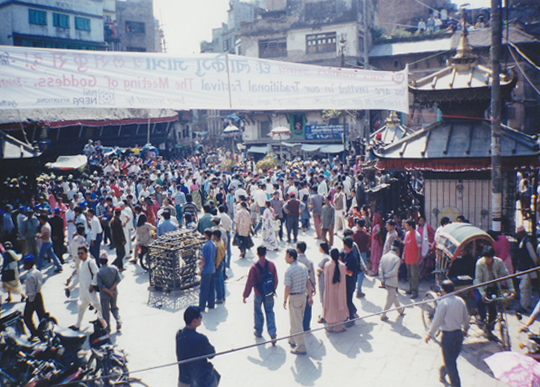
Asan from northeast

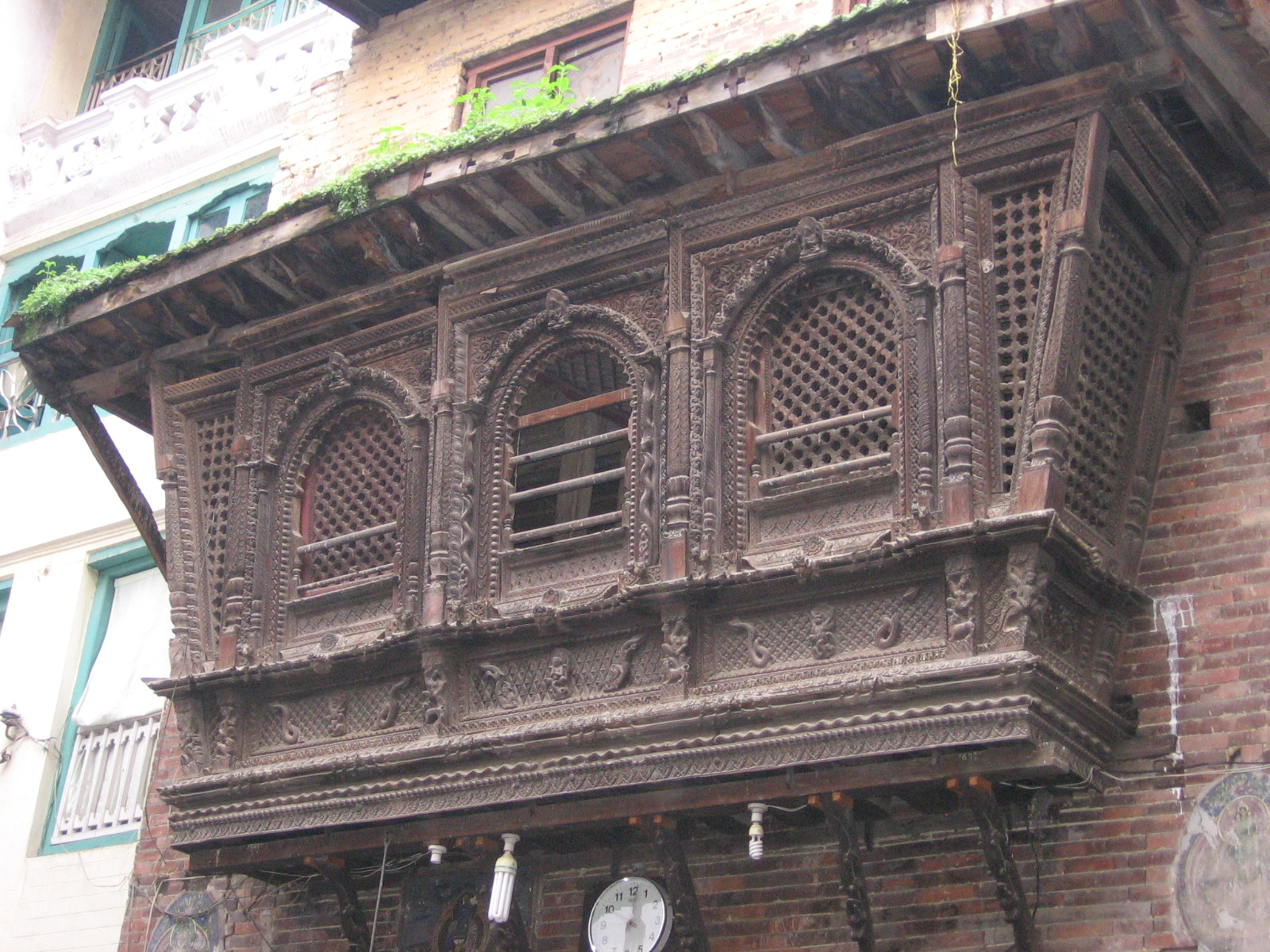
Carved window, Dhalasikwa Baha

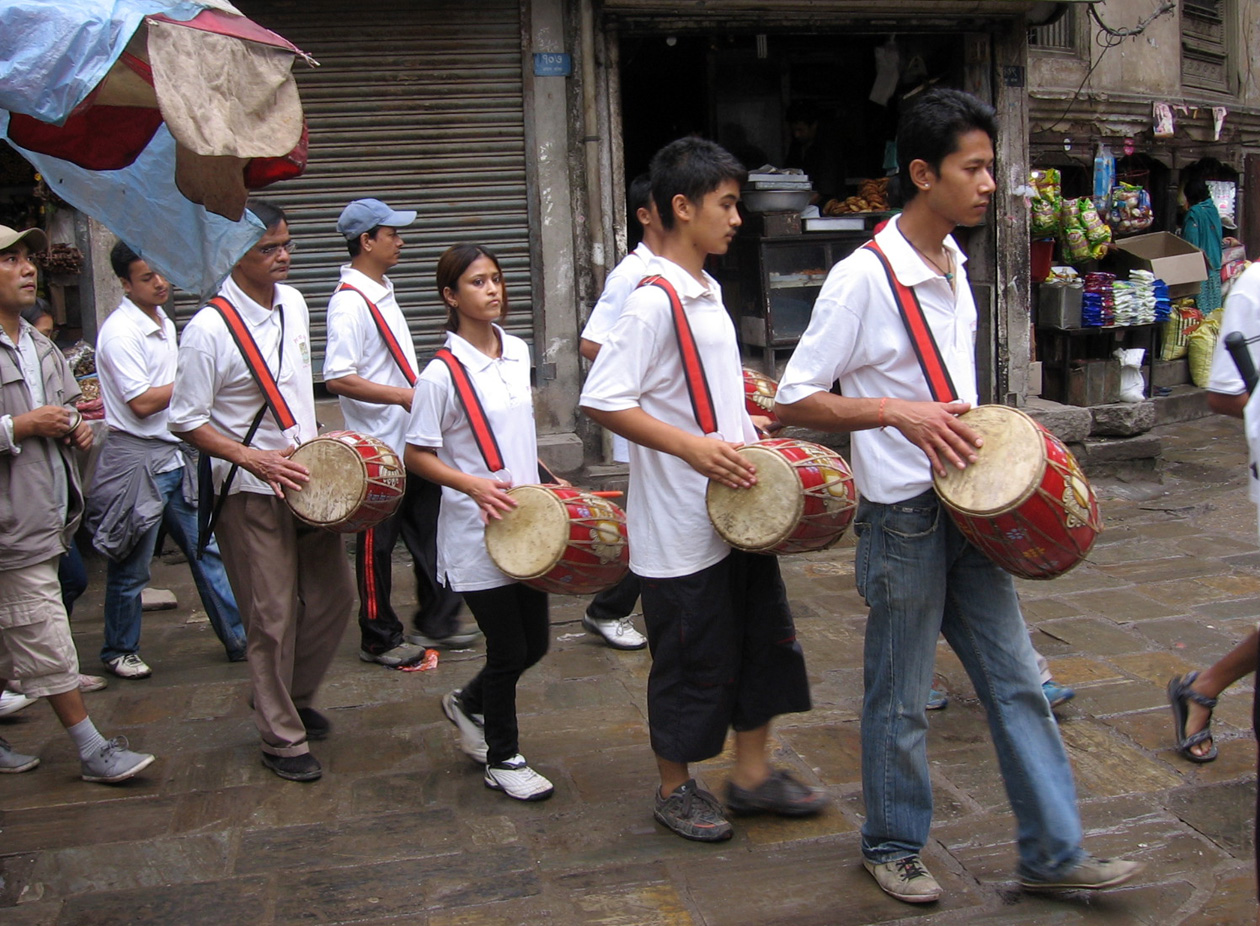
Gunla Bajan musical band

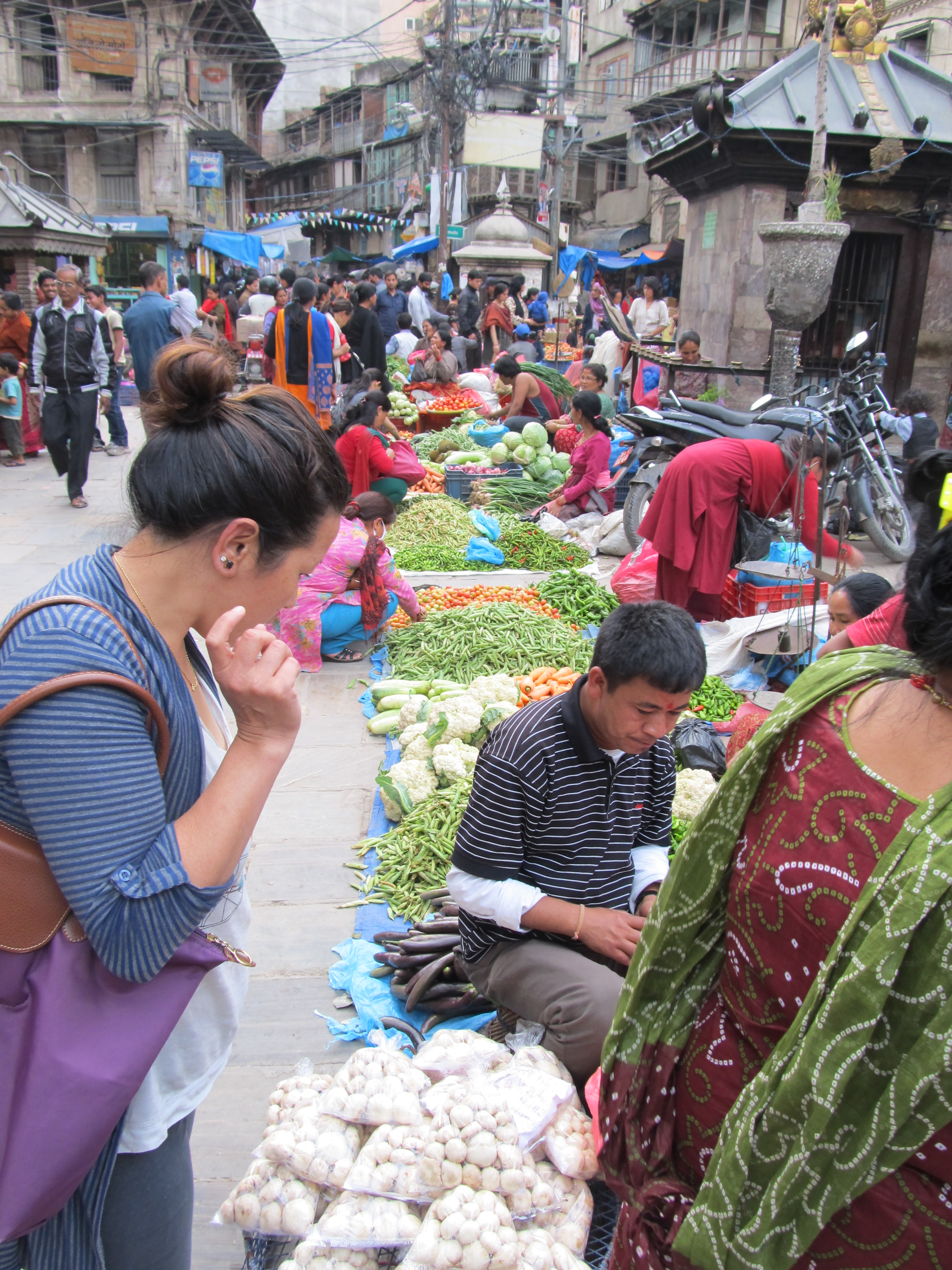
Vegetables on sale

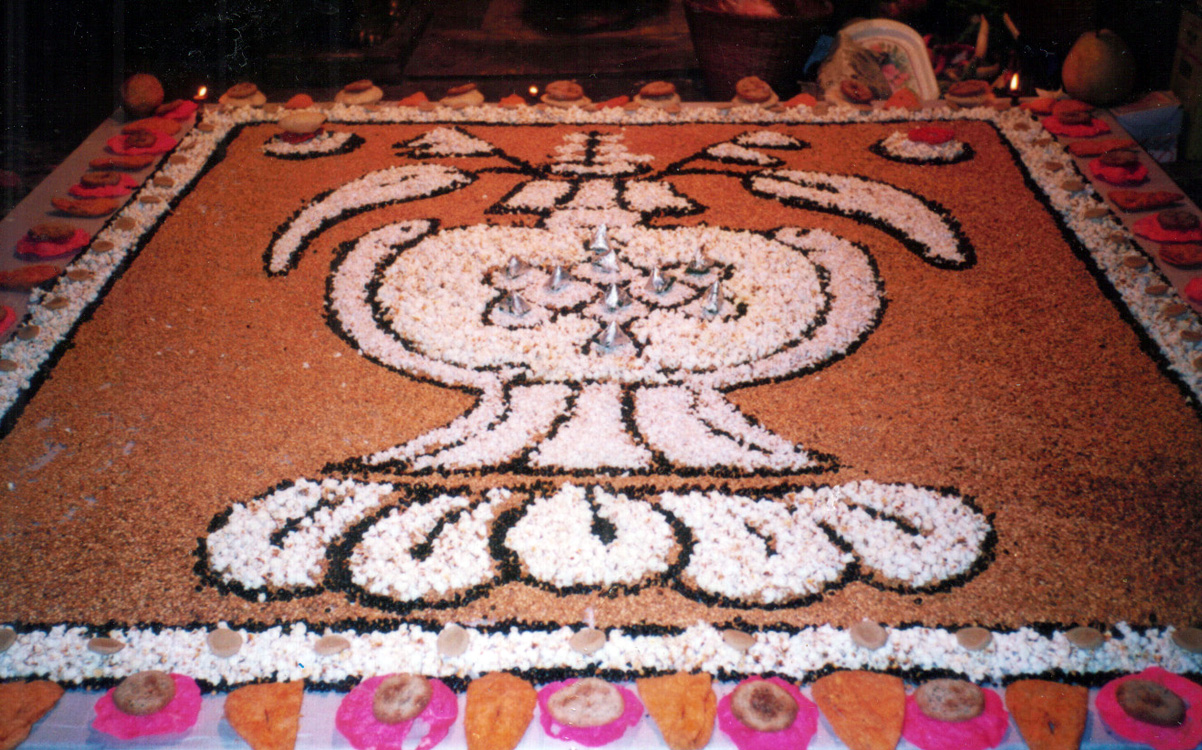
Grain art display

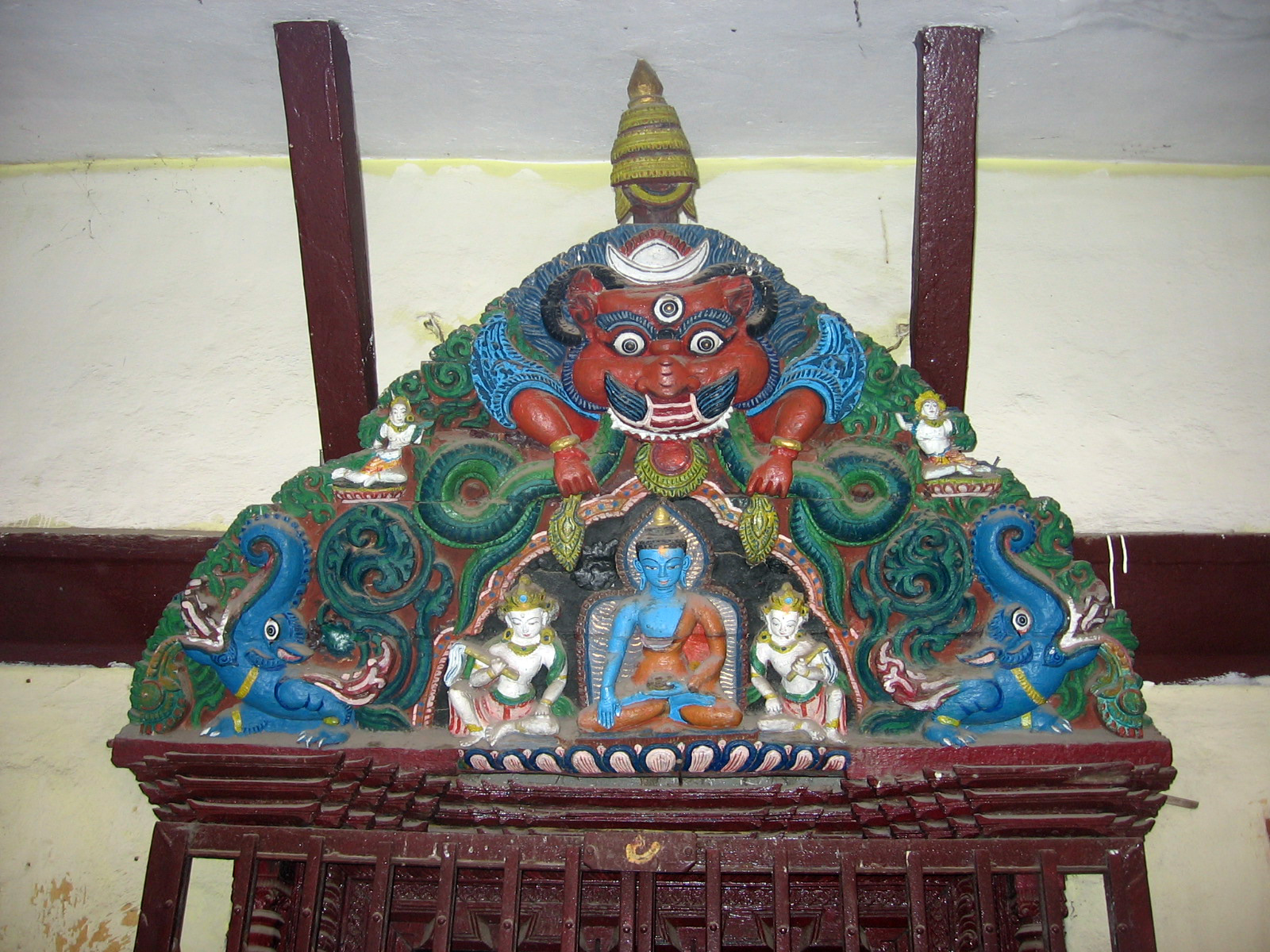
Tympanum at Hwakha Baha

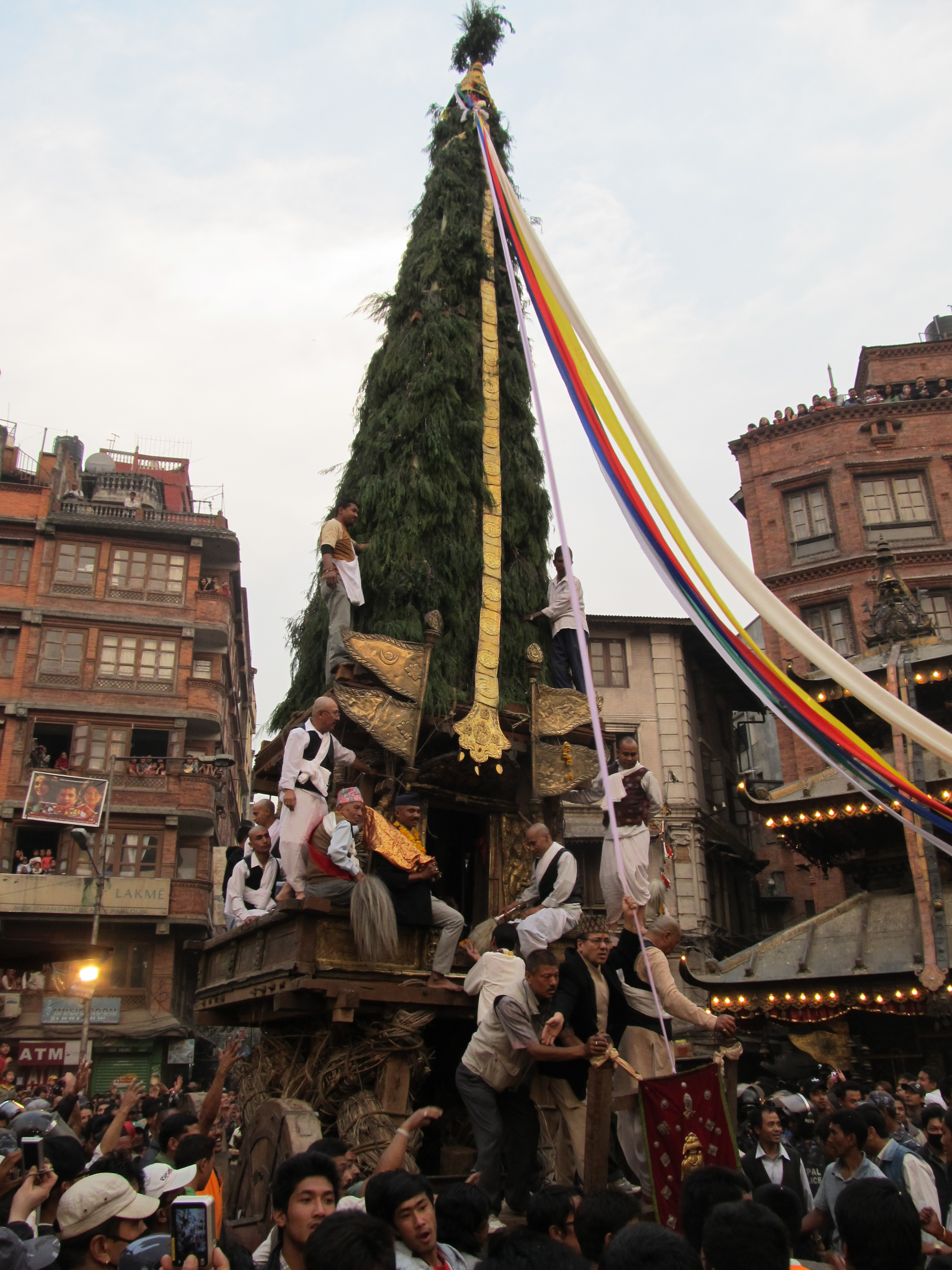
Chariot of Jana Baha Dyah

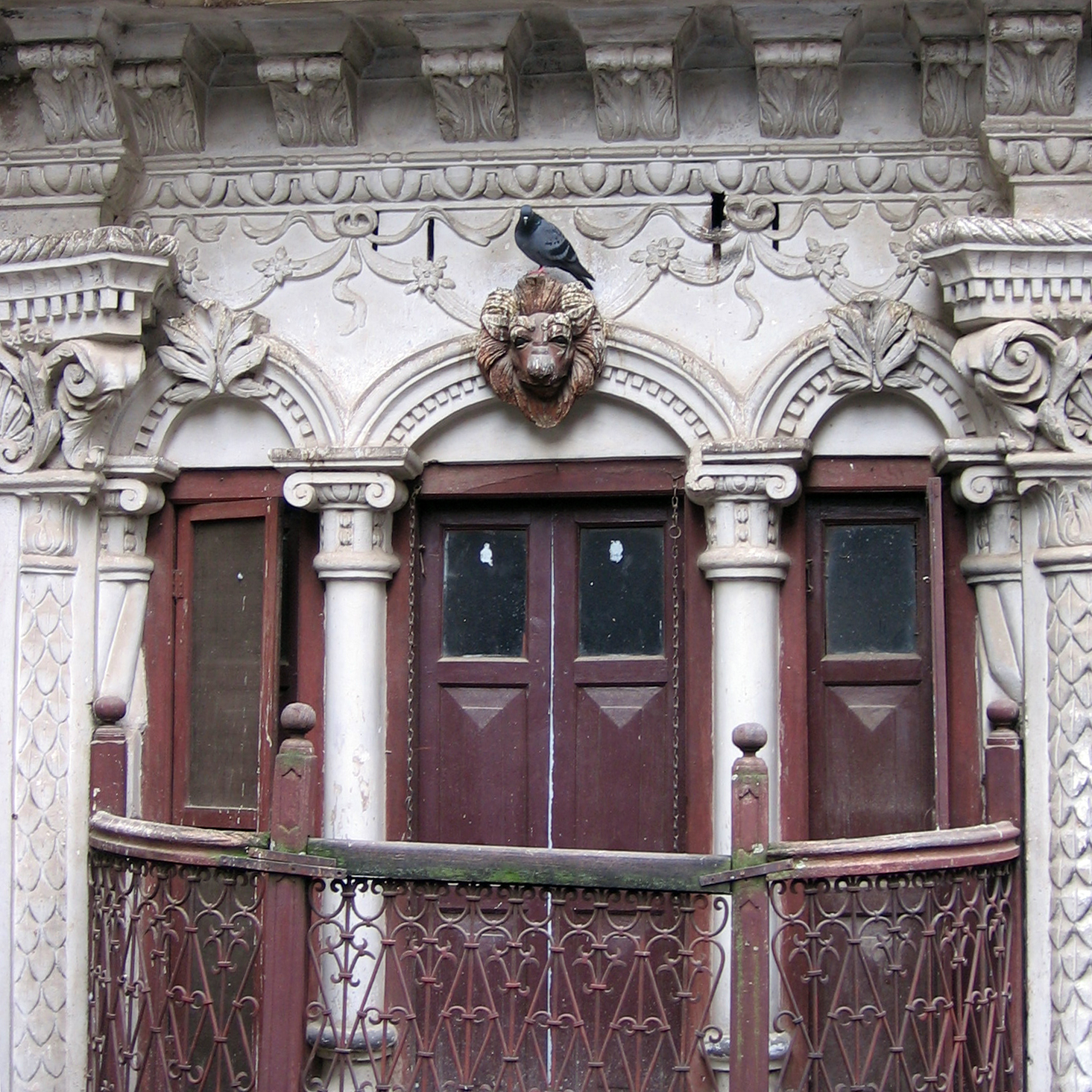
Facade

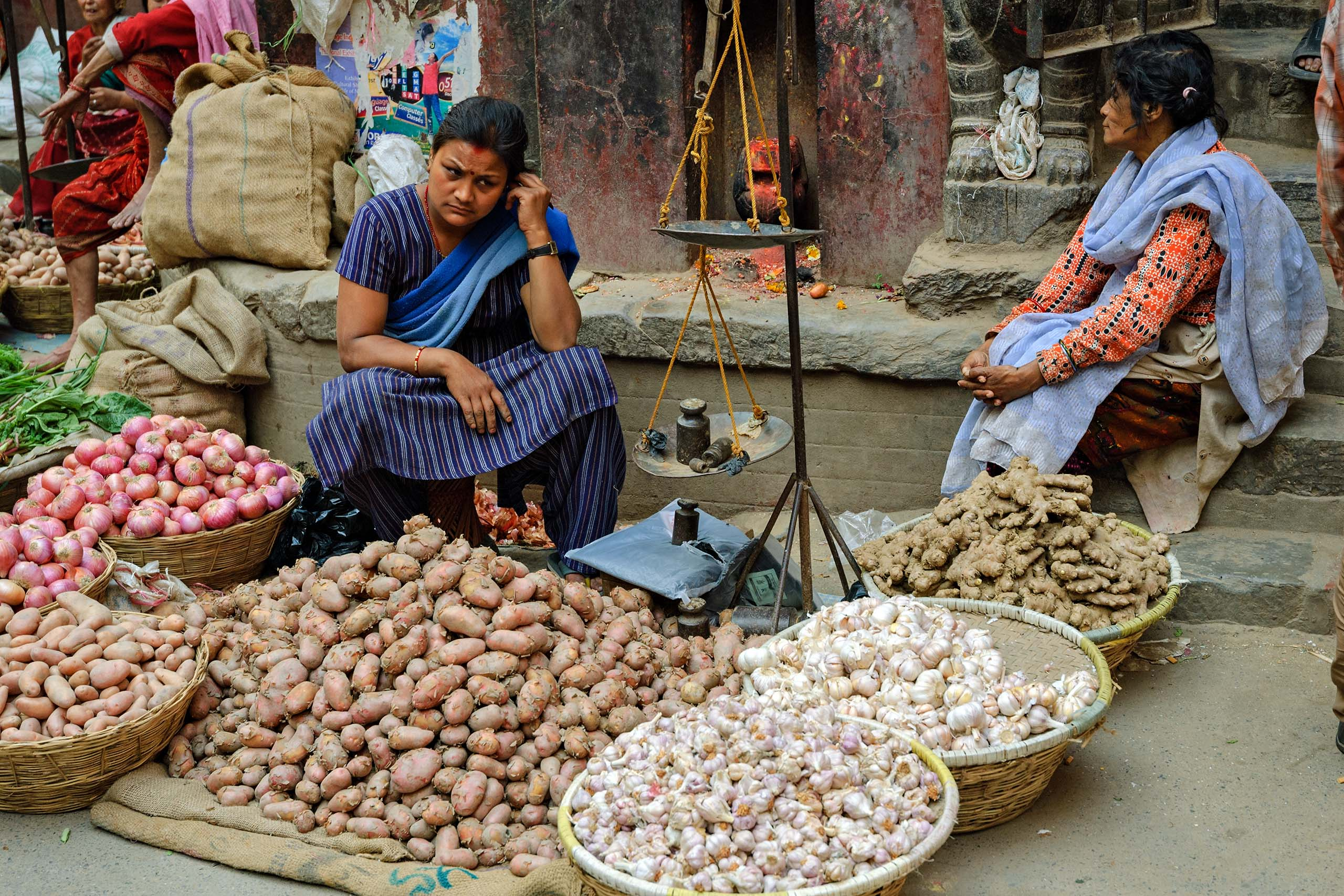
Asan Bazaar, woman selling vegetables in front of Jwala Mai temple, Kathmandu, Nepal

== See also ==
- List of bazaars in Nepal
- Kalimati fruit and vegetable market
