= Southside =

Southside or South Side may refer to:

== Places ==
=== Australia ===
- Southside, Queensland, a semi-rural locality in the Gympie Region

=== Canada ===
- South Side, Newfoundland and Labrador, a community in the St. George's Bay area on the southwest coast of Newfoundland

=== United Kingdom ===
- Southside, Birmingham, an area in Birmingham, England
- South Side, County Durham, a village in County Durham, England
- Southside, Edinburgh, a community in the city of Edinburgh, Scotland
- South Side, Glasgow, a district south of the River Clyde in Glasgow, Scotland
- Southside Wandsworth, a shopping centre in Wandsworth, South London, England

=== Ireland ===
- Southside, Dublin, an area in Dublin, Ireland

=== United States ===
- Southside, Alabama
- Southside, Birmingham, Alabama
- Southside, Independence County, Arkansas
- Southside, Van Buren County, Arkansas
- Southside, Berkeley, California
- South Side, Chicago, a section of Chicago, Illinois
- Southside (East Chicago), a neighborhood of East Chicago, Indiana
- Southside, Louisville, a neighborhood in Louisville, Kentucky
- Southside Township, Minnesota, a township in Minnesota
- South Jamaica, Queens or Southside, a section of Queens, New York
- Southside–Saint Teresa, a neighborhood in Durham, North Carolina
- Southside, Greensboro, North Carolina, a neighborhood in Greensboro, North Carolina
- South Side (Columbus, Ohio), a neighborhood in Columbus, Ohio
- South Side (Pittsburgh), a neighborhood in Pittsburgh, Pennsylvania
- South Side, Providence, Rhode Island
- Southside, Hardin County, Tennessee
- Southside, Montgomery County, Tennessee
- Southside, Saint Thomas, U.S. Virgin Islands, a census subdistrict of the U.S. Virgin Islands

==== Virginia ====
- Southside (Richmond, Virginia), the portion of Richmond that is south of the James River
- Southside (Virginia), the portion of Virginia south of the James River
- South Hampton Roads, commonly called "the Southside"

== Music ==
- Southside Festival, a German music festival

=== Albums ===
- Southside (Lloyd album) or the title song (see below), 2004
- Southside (Sam Hunt album), 2020
- Southside (Texas album) or the title song, 1989

=== Songs ===
- "South Side" (song), by Moby, 1999
- "Southside" (Lil Baby song), 2018
- "Southside" (Lil' Keke song), 1997
- "Southside" (Lloyd song), 2004
- "Southside", by Common from Finding Forever, 2007
- "Southside", by Dave Clarke, 1996
- "Southside", by David Dallas from Falling into Place, 2013
- "SouthSide", by DJ Snake from Carte Blanche, 2019

== People with the name ==
- Southside (record producer) (Joshua Howard Luellen; born 1989), American record producer
- Southside Johnny (John Lyon; born 1948), American singer, harmonica player, and songwriter

== Other uses ==
- South Side (cocktail)
- South Side (TV series), a 2019–2022 American sitcom
- Southside, a gang in Belize

== See also ==
- South London, the southern part of London, England
- South Hampton Roads, the southern portion of the Hampton Roads metropolitan area of Virginia and locally called "the Southside"
- Southside High School (disambiguation)
- Southsider (disambiguation)
