= List of neighbourhoods of Kathmandu =

This is a list of neighborhoods in the metropolitan city of Kathmandu, the capital and the largest municipality of Nepal. The 2011 census placed its population at about 975,000. Kathmandu is composed of neighborhoods, which are utilised quite extensively and more familiar among locals. However, administratively the city is divided into 35 wards, numbered from 1 to 35.

List of neighborhoods of Kathmandu:

- Baluwatar
- Baneshwor
- Chabahil
- Dilli Bazaar
- Gairidhara
- Gyaneshwar
- Kalimati
- Lazimpat
- Maru
- Naxal
- Samakhushi
- Sinamangal
- Swayambhu (including major areas around the Stupa)
- Thamel
- Balaju
- Maharajgunj
- Banasthali
- Nayabazar
- Shorakhutte
- Lainchaur
- New Road
- Dallu
- Chhauni
- Kalanki
- Teku
- Tripureshwor
- Kuleshwor
- Asan
- Thapathali
- Maitighar
- Tinkune
- Koteshwor
- Bagbazar
- Anamnagar
- Kamaladi
- Hattisar
- Durbarmarg
- Chandol
- Bansbari
- Dhumbarahi
- Sukedhara
- Boudha
- Gaushala
- Handigaun
