= Southsider =

Southsider or Southsiders may refer to:

== Geography ==
- Southsiders, or Vancouver Southsiders, independent supporters group for Vancouver Whitecaps FC of Major League Soccer
- Southsiders, natives of Southside, Dublin, notable Southsiders including Maeve Binchy
- Southsiders, natives of the Gorbals in Glasgow
- Southsiders, natives of South Side, Chicago

== Music ==
- Southsiders (album), a 2014 album by Atmosphere
- The Southsiders, original band of Dave Stewart (musician, born 1950)

== Films ==
- The Southsiders, 1932 Swedish film

== Sports ==
- The Chicago White Sox, who are often nicknamed the "South Siders"

== See also ==
- Southside (disambiguation)
