= Birendra Sainik Awasiya Mahavidyalaya =

Public military school in Bhaktapur, Nepal

Sainik Awasiya Mahavidhyalaya
- सैनिक आवासीय महाविद्यालय
- Sallaghari, Bhaktapur; Bagmati; Nepal

Information
- Type: Public
- Motto: ज्ञानेन परमो सेवा (Imparting Knowledge is the Biggest Service)
- Established: 1986
- Authority: Nepal Army
- Principal: Dal Prasad Pun
- Teaching staff: 200
- Employees: 250
- Grades: 6 to 12 and B.Sc., BBA
- Enrollment: 4500
- Campus size: 5000
- Colours: Green, red, blue, yellow
- Athletics: Basketball, Cricket, Football, Gymnastics, Taekwondo, Volleyball, Athletics, Kabaddi, etc.
- Publication: Sallaghari
- Affiliation: National Examination Board, Tribhuvan University
- Website: bsamv.edu.np

Birendra Sainik Maha Vidyalaya Ground (Army School Ground)
- Interactive map of Birendra Sainik Maha Vidyalaya Ground (Army School Ground)

Ground information
- Location: Sallaghari, Bhaktapur
- Country: Nepal
- Capacity: 5,000+
- Owner: Birendra Sainik Awasiya Mahavidyalaya
- Operator: Cricket Association of Nepal
- Tenants: Nepal national cricket team
- End names
- Hospital End; Army Camp End
- First men's ODI: 20 February 2010: Nepal v Jersey
- Last men's ODI: 27 February 2010: Singapore v Bahrain

Team information
Sainik Seals
Sainik Sharks

Sainik Awasiya Mahavidyalaya is a military boarding high school in Nepal, established in 1986. The school was formerly known as Birendra Sainik Awasiya Mahavidyalaya and Suping Campus. The school is located in Sallaghari, Bhaktapur. It was established in 1986 in Sallaghari, Bhaktapur. Sainik Awasiya Mahavidyalaya is a military boarding school with civilian students, offering classes from 6th grade through undergraduate level, including a Bachelor of Science degree; the school also provides hostel facilities for both boys and girls and has branch schools in several cities across Nepal.

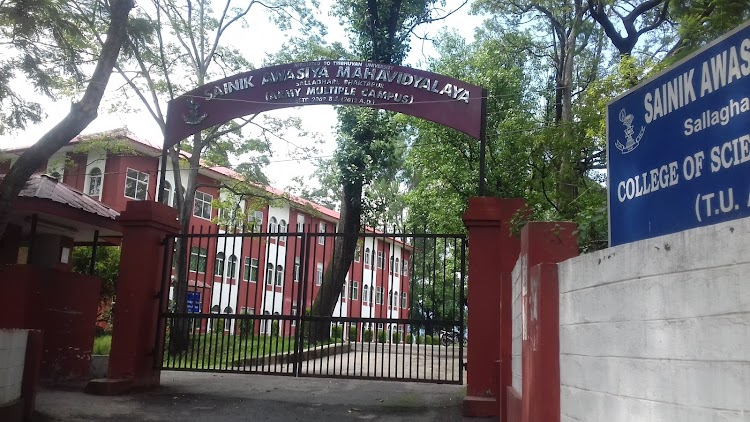
Main entrance of the school

== History ==
In 1978, with the joint investment of the Nepali Army (then the Royal Nepalese Army) and Tribhuvan University , Suping Army Campus was established at Suping, Bhimphedi of Makawanpur district. With its foundation, the campus conducted classes for the intermediate level in the faculty of humanities and social science. Later, in 1981, it began classes in the faculty of science as well. The Suping Army Campus was established during the tenure of General Singha Pratap Shah, then Chief of Army Staff (COAS).

In 1986, the campus was relocated to Sallaghari, Bhaktapur, where it was renamed Birendra Sainik Awasiya Mahavidyalaya after King Birendra Bir Bikram Shah. Since then, the funding of the school has been looked after by Nepal Army Welfare Fund.

== Branches in Nepal ==
S.N.	name	Location	Province
1	Bjeshwori Gyan Mandir Sainik Mahavidhyalaya	Bijeshwori, Kathmandu	Bagmati Province
2	Sainik Awasiya Mahavidyalaya	Chitwan	Bagmati Province
3	Ripumardini Sainik Mahavidhyalaya	Bansbari, Kathmandu	Bagmati Province
4	Sainik Awasiya Mahavidyalaya	Pokhara, Kaski	Gandaki Province
5	Sainik Aawasiya Mahvidyalaya	Dharan, Sunsari	Koshi Province
6	Sainik Aawasiya Mahavidyala	Surkhet	Karnali Province
7	Sainik Aawasiya Mahvidyalaya	Kailali	Sudurpashchim Province
8	Sainik Awasiya Mahavidhyalaya	Bardibas, Mahottari	Madhesh Province

== Curriculum ==
The school previously conducted entrance exams for students enrolling for 4th grade. Currently, the school begins its classes at 6th grade and admits students based on competitive entrance exams and interviews, with a limited number of seats allocated according to quotas. The school offers education from 6th to 10th grade, following the national curriculum, and prepares students for the Secondary Education Examination. After 10th grade, students can choose to pursue a variety of science, management, and humanities programs, which require passing a competitive entrance exam and interview. The school's bachelor's degree programs include B.Sc. (Microbiology), BBA, and BBS, with a similar selection process.

== Administration ==
The institution is controlled administratively by the Nepal Army Headquarters and academically by teachers and professors. The highest officer from the military to administer SAMB is a Lt. Colonel who acts as a liaison officer. Other military staffs are designated several posts in administering the Mahavidyalaya as a whole. Major and Captain of the Army are officers who are offered such posts.

=== Past principals ===
- Hemanta Sumsher Jung Bahadur Rana
- Kamal Singh Rathour
- Prof. Dr. Vinod Shrestha
- Indu Mani Chemjong
- Shamim A. Shamim
- Surendra Paneru
- Dal Prasad Pun (present)

=== Past Liaison Officer ===
- Jeevan Thapa
- Bhupal Man Adhikari
- Dev Bahadur Chettri
- Anup Shah
- Santosh Karki
- Narayan Thapa
- Arjun Adhikari (present)

=== Past Logistic Officers ===
- Murarai Sapkota
- Pramod Karki
- Shantosh Khatri (present)

== Sports ==
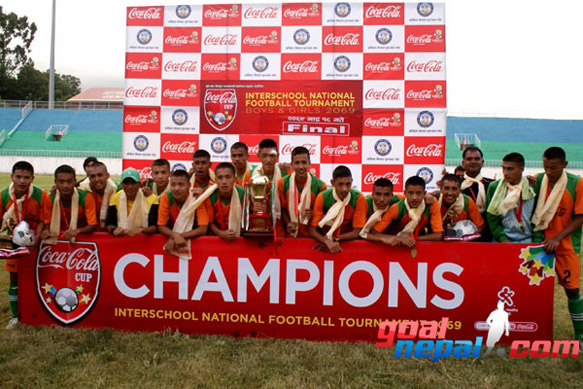
Sainik school winning Coca-Cola Cup at 2069 BS

The school has won several tournaments from district level to national levels. It includes Football, Cricket, Taekwondo, Volleyball, Swimming, Gymnastic, Basketball, Athletics, Badminton, etc. as the sports activities in the Mahavidyalaya. It also organizes various national interschool events such as COAS T20 Interschool Cricket Tournament, COAS Interschool Football Tournament and many more.

== Achievements ==
- Prakriti Malla of Grade 8 won the “best handwriting” competition in all Nepal, and also won the title of the best handwriting on the globe in 2016.
- Sandip Pandit of the 19th School Batch won Best Player in the 6th Korean Ambassador National Taekwondo Championship in the poomsae category held in Kathmandu, Nepal on Dec 17–19, 2013. It was jointly organized by The Embassy of the Republic of Korea and The Nepal Taekwondo Association.
- In December 2021, Sujan Shrestha (27th school batch) won a bronze medal at the Nepal Open International Virtual Taekwondo Championship, which was participated in by athletes from 30 different countries.
