= Fajja =

Fajja فجّة
- Etymology: from personal name
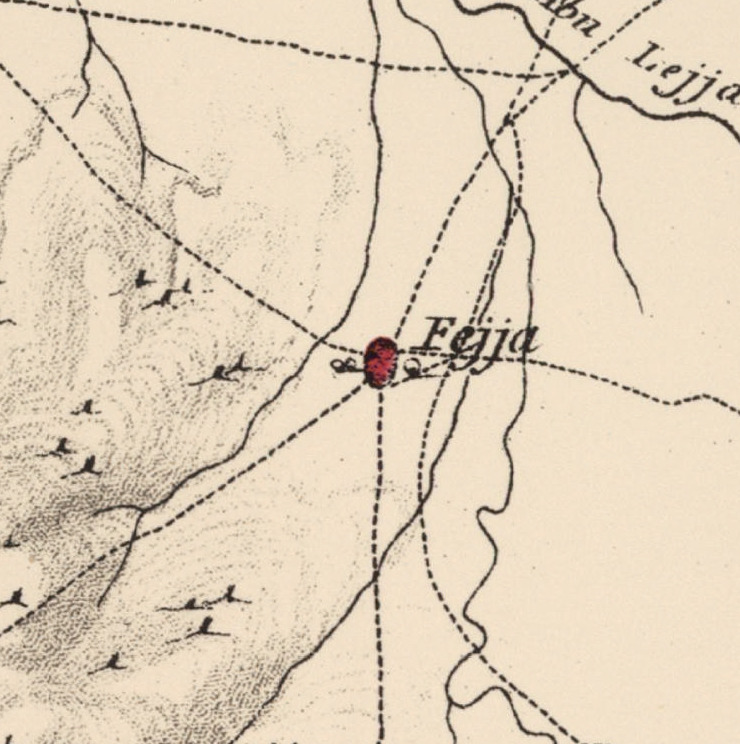
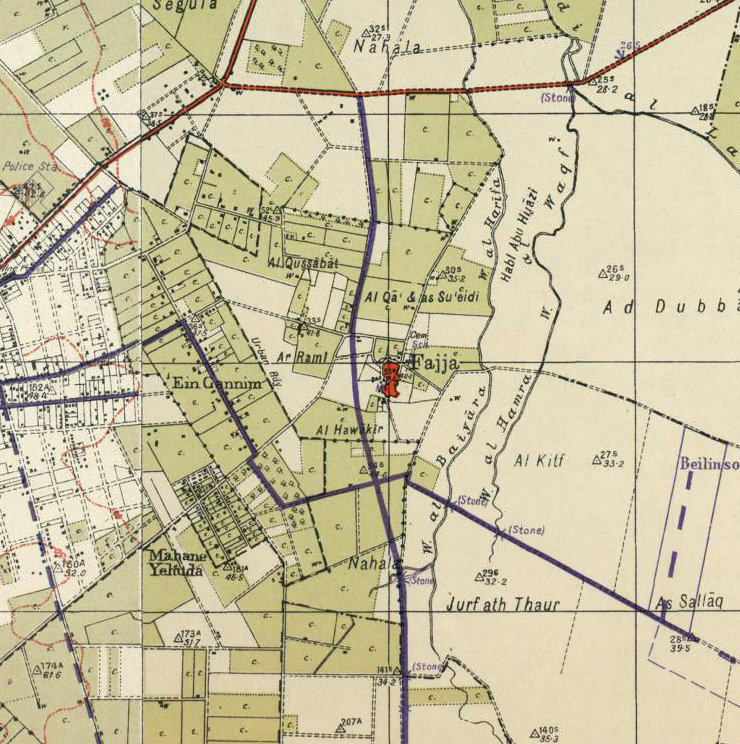
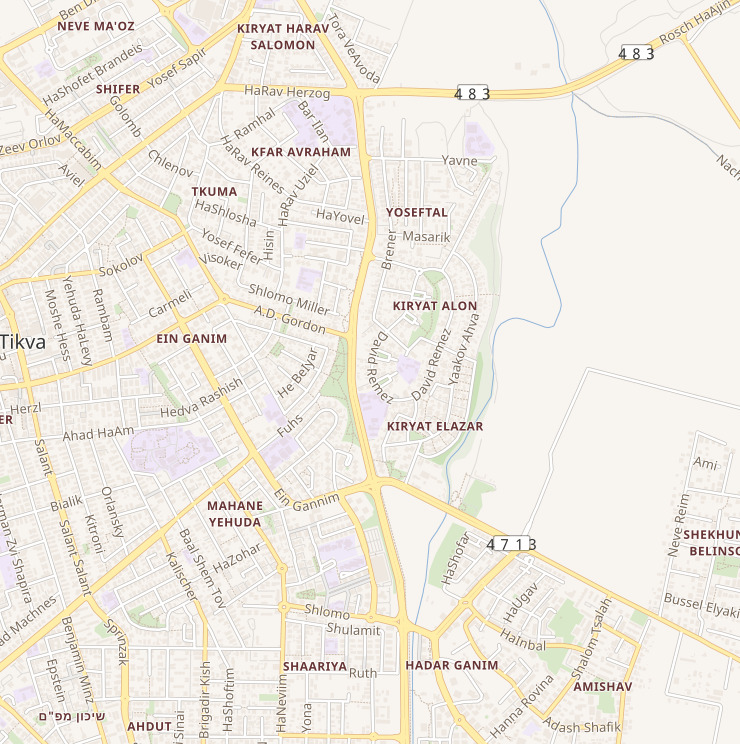
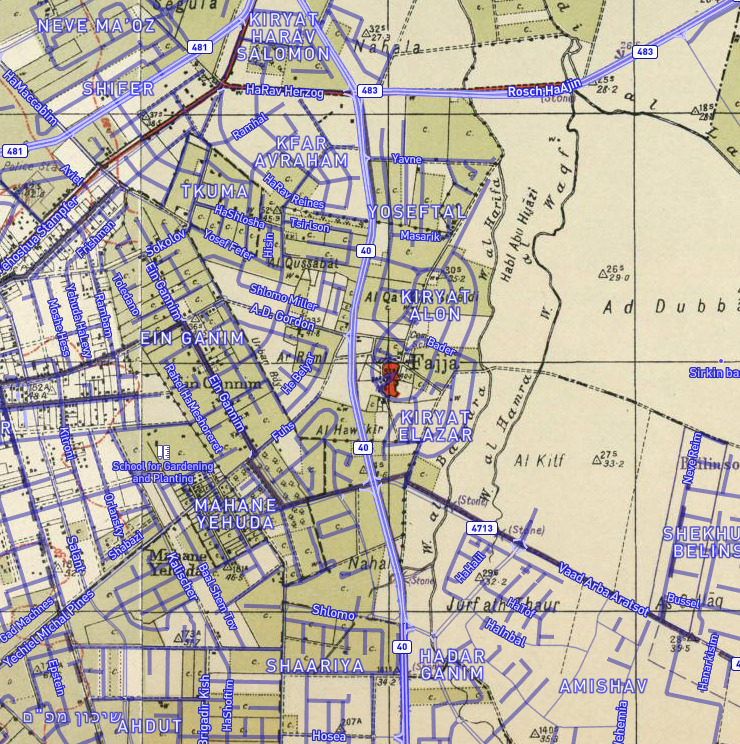
- 1870s map 1940s map modern map 1940s with modern overlay map A series of historical maps of the area around Fajja (click the buttons)

- Location within Mandatory Palestine
- Coordinates: 32°05′12″N 34°54′8″E
- Palestine grid: 141/165
- Geopolitical entity: Mandatory Palestine
- Subdistrict: Jaffa
- Date of depopulation: May 15, 1948

Area
  - Total: 4.4 km^{2} (1.7 sq mi)

Population (1945)
  - Total: 1,200
- Cause(s) of depopulation: Whispering campaign
- Current Localities: Petah Tikva

Fajja (Arabic: فجّة) was a Palestinian town located 15 kilometers northeast of Jaffa. Ethnically cleansed during the Nakba, its land area is today part of the Israeli city of Petah Tikva.

== History ==
Pottery remains from the Chalcolithic, Middle Bronze II, Iron, Persian and Roman eras have been found here.

Winepresses, dated to the Roman/Byzantine era (5th and 6th century) have been excavated here, and pottery remains from the Byzantine era have also been found.

Pottery from the early Islamic period (eighth–tenth centuries CE) have been excavated here, as has glass artefacts from the early Umayyad era, and ceramic jugs from the Abbasid era.

Ceramic vessels dating to the twelfth–thirteenth centuries CE (ie Crusader or Ayyubid era) "including a glazed yellow bowl with an incised decoration that may represent a Latin letter" have also been found.

=== Ottoman era ===
In 1856 the village was named el−Fejjeh on Kiepert's map of Palestine published that year.

In 1870, Victor Guérin found the village to be divided into two quarters, each with its own Sheikh. He estimated it to have 300 inhabitants, while an Ottoman village list from about the same year found that Fajja had a population of 110, in 35 houses, though the population count only included men.

In 1882, the PEF's Survey of Western Palestine (SWP) described Fajja as a small village built of adobe bricks.

=== British Mandate era ===
In the 1922 census of Palestine, conducted by the British Mandate authorities, Fajjeh had a population of 164, all Muslims, increasing sharply in the 1931 census, to 707, still all Muslims, in a total of 165 houses.

The town had one elementary school, founded in 1922. By 1945 it had 181 students, including 10 females.

In the 1945 statistics, Fajja had 1,200 Muslim inhabitants, in addition to 370 Jews, and a total land area of 4,419 dunams. Of this, a total of 768 dunams was used for citrus and bananas, 61 dunams were irrigated or used for orchards, 3,863 used for cereals, while 7 dunams were classified as built-up areas.

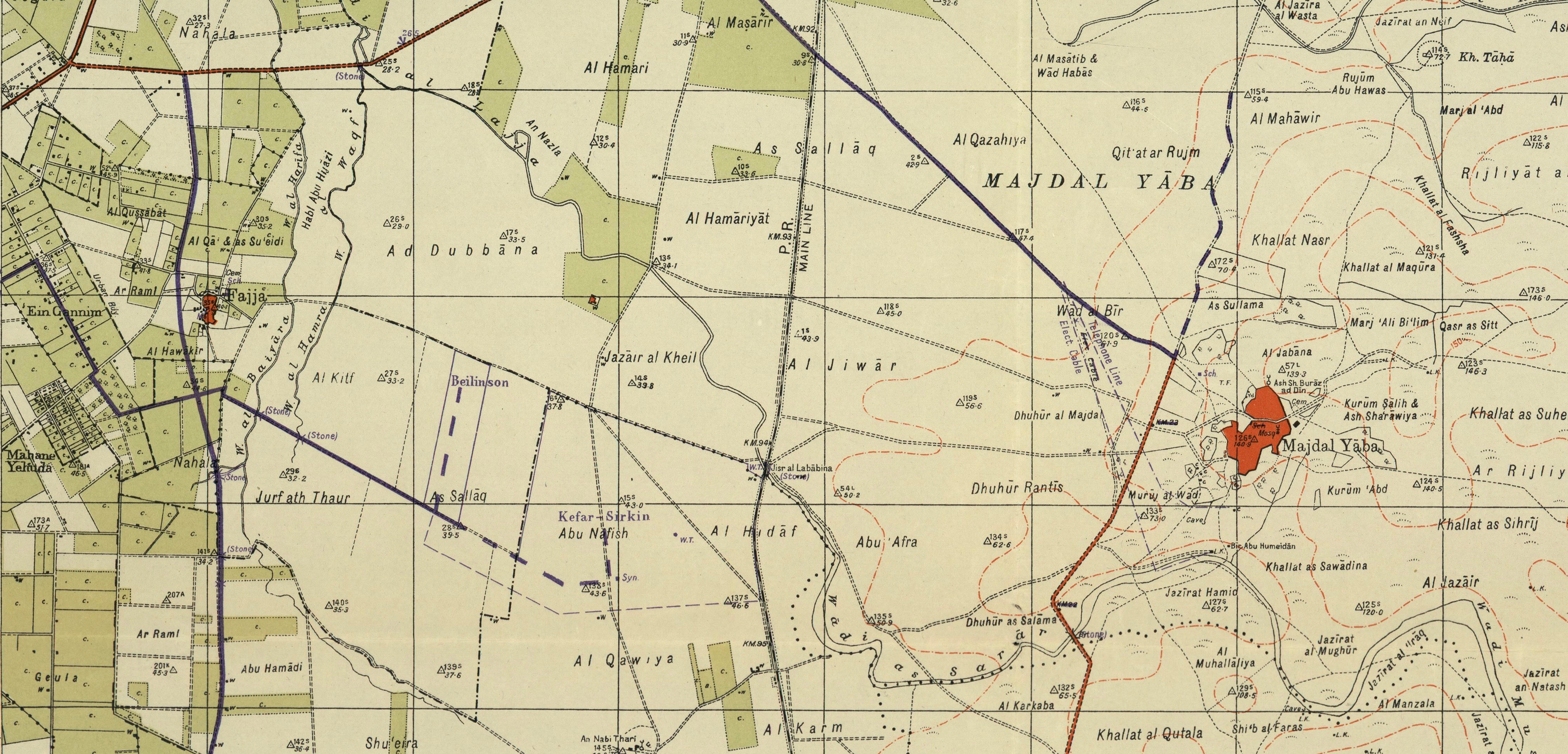
Fajja 1941 1:20,000

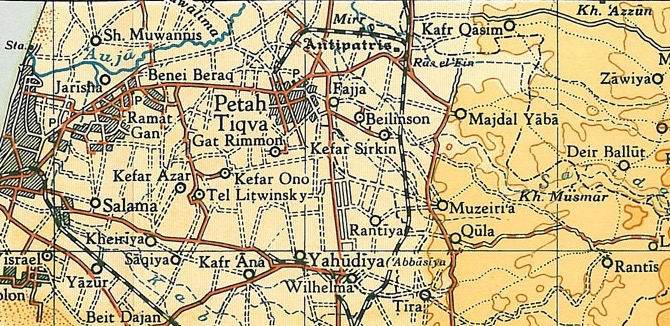
Fajja 1945 1:250,000

=== 1948, aftermath ===
In early April, the villagers of Fajja sued for a truce with their Jewish neighbours. Also, the villagers of Fajja later contacted their Jewish neighbours and promised "quiet". It was occupied by the Haganah and Irgun on May 15, 1948, without any resistance. Most of the Arab inhabitants fled the town before its capture by Israeli forces due to alleged attacks by the Irgun on February 17. In June 1948, the town was demolished based on the recommendation of Yosef Weitz of the Jewish National Fund. Most of the town's land is currently a part of the jurisdiction of the city of Petah Tikva.

In 1992 the village site was described by Walid Khalidi: "The village has been completely razed except for one house and a pond. Eucalyptus trees and cactuses further mark the site. The surrounding land is partly occupied by buildings; the rest is cultivated."

== See also ==
- Kfar Avraham
- Depopulated Palestinian locations in Israel
- List of villages depopulated during the Arab-Israeli conflict

== Bibliography ==
- Bar-Nathan, Rachel (2002). The Jacob Kaplan and Haya Ritter-Kaplan Legacy (PDF). Hadashot Arkheologiyot – Excavations and Surveys in Israel. pp. 104−109.
- Barron, J.B., ed. (1923). Palestine: Report and General Abstracts of the Census of 1922. Government of Palestine.
- Conder, C.R.; Kitchener, H.H. (1882). The Survey of Western Palestine: Memoirs of the Topography, Orography, Hydrography, and Archaeology. Vol. 2. London: Committee of the Palestine Exploration Fund.
- Department of Statistics (1945). Village Statistics, April, 1945. Government of Palestine.
- Gorzalczany, Amir (2005-11-28). "Petah Tiqwa, Mahane Yehuda". Hadashot Arkheologiyot – Excavations and Surveys in Israel (117).
- Guérin, V. (1875). Description Géographique Historique et Archéologique de la Palestine (in French). Vol. 2: Samarie, pt. 2. Paris: L'Imprimerie Nationale.
- Hadawi, S. (1970). Village Statistics of 1945: A Classification of Land and Area ownership in Palestine. Palestine Liberation Organization Research Center.
- Haddad, Elie (2009-01-09). "Petah Tiqwa". Hadashot Arkheologiyot – Excavations and Surveys in Israel (121).
- Hartmann, M. (1883). "Die Ortschaftenliste des Liwa Jerusalem in dem türkischen Staatskalender für Syrien auf das Jahr 1288 der Flucht (1871)". Zeitschrift des Deutschen Palästina-Vereins. 6: 102–149.
- Khalidi, W. (1992). All That Remains: The Palestinian Villages Occupied and Depopulated by Israel in 1948. Washington D.C.: Institute for Palestine Studies. ISBN 0-88728-224-5.
- Mills, E, ed. (1932). Census of Palestine 1931. Population of Villages, Towns and Administrative Areas. Jerusalem: Government of Palestine.
- Morris, B. (2004). The Birth of the Palestinian Refugee Problem Revisited. Cambridge University Press. ISBN 978-0-521-00967-6. (pp. 314, 342, 349, 350)
- Palmer, E.H. (1881). The Survey of Western Palestine: Arabic and English Name Lists Collected During the Survey by Lieutenants Conder and Kitchener, R. E. Transliterated and Explained by E.H. Palmer. Committee of the Palestine Exploration Fund.
- Socin, A. (1879). "Alphabetisches Verzeichniss von Ortschaften des Paschalik Jerusalem". Zeitschrift des Deutschen Palästina-Vereins. 2: 135–163.
