= Kfar Avraham =

Kfar Avraham כפר אברהם
- Local council
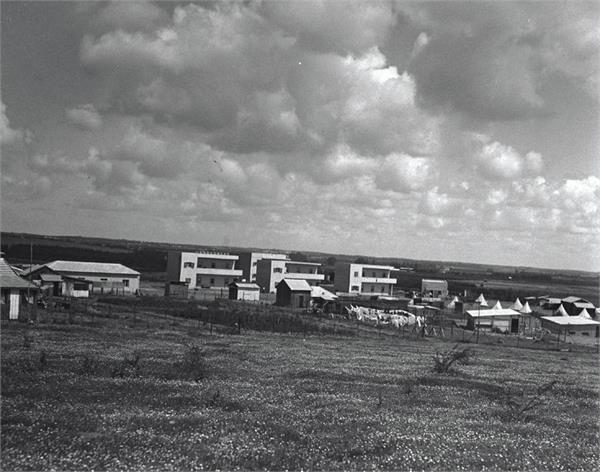
- Kfar Avraham 1937

- Location within Israel
- Coordinates: 32°05′42″N 34°53′50″E
- District: Northern
- Founded: March 1932
- Name meaning: Avraham's village

Kfar Avraham (Hebrew: כפר אברהם) was a moshav founded by the Hapoel HaMizrachi organization in March 1932. Kfar Avraham officially became part of Petah Tikva in 1952 and is today a neighborhood in the northern part of the city.

== History ==
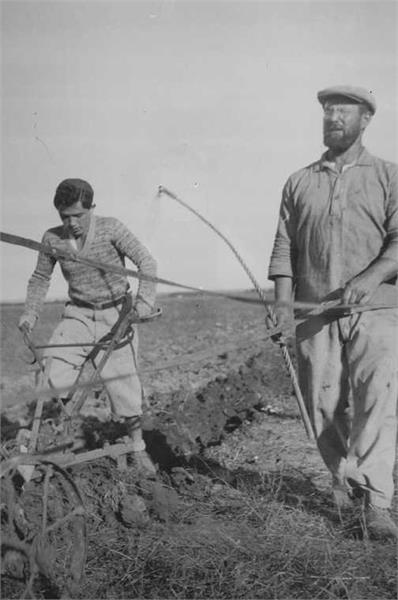
Plowing the fields in Kfar Avraham

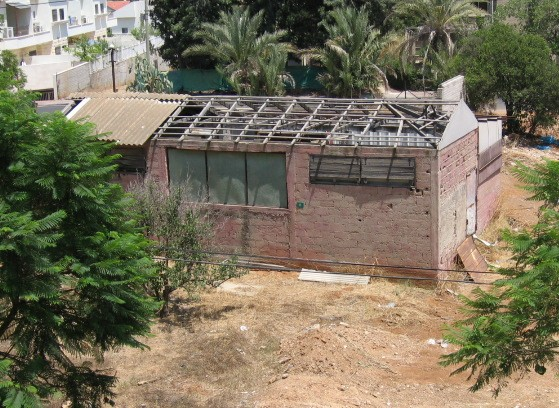
One of the last remains of the original settlement

In 1913 the Jewish philanthropist Paul Natan from southern Germany purchased 800 dunams of land near the Arab village of Fajja. The lands were transferred to the ownership of rabbi Abraham Salvendi in order for him to establish a child orphanage at the site. These plans were interrupted due to World War I and he managed only to build a single building and a water well on those lands.

After World War I Salvendi appointed Professor Peake, from the Mizrachi movement, as the Custodian of the Lands, and he allowed the Rodges Group to settle on some of the lands temporarily until they would establish a their permanent settlement elsewhere. The Rodges Group settled in the northeast part of those lands. This group later became the head organization of the Religious Kibbutz Movement. The Rodges group later moved to the southern part of Mandatory Palestine and established the Kvutzat Yavne (The Yavneh Group). The buildings and the area of the Rodges group were then transferred to ownership of the Mizrachi women Organization of America, which established at the site a pioneer religious-agricultural institution called the Mossad Aliyah.

In 1932, some of the land was leased to 25 religious settlers who established a religious workers' moshav, initially called a "Salvendi moshav". During the 1930s cows were brought to the settlement and a central dairy farm was established. In addition, a school and a synagogue were built in barracks at the center of the moshav.

In 1941 Rabbi Salvendi transferred the ownership of the village's lands, without any compensation, to the Jewish National Fund. In 1952, Kfar Avraham officially became part of Petah Tikva.

During the 1990s, most of the houses were completely demolished and only a few houses remained. The modest houses, orchards and fields were replaced eventually by villas and private homes.

== Popular culture ==
- In 1988 the Israeli film Aviya's Summer, based on the autobiographical novel by Israeli theater actress Gila Almagor, was shot in the location of the former moshav. The film is one of the only records of the authentic appearance of the original settlers houses in the moshav.
