= White Oak New Town Historic District =

Historic district in North Carolina, United States

- U.S. National Register of Historic Places
- U.S. Historic district
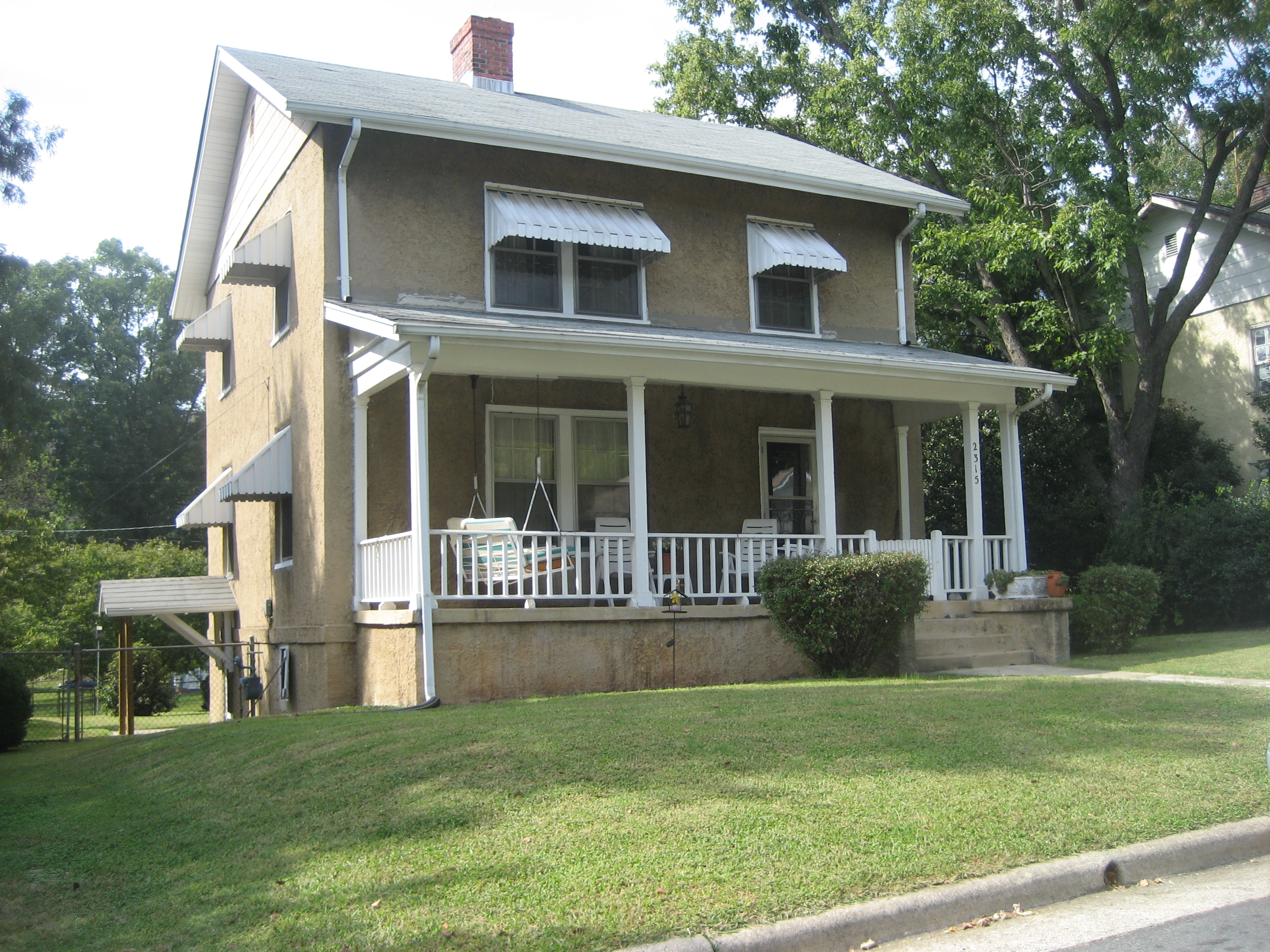
- House in the White Oak New Town Historic District, September 2012

- Location within North Carolina Location within the United States
- Location: 2400-2418 N. Church, 2312-2509 Spruce, 2310-2503 Hubbard and 2401-2503 Cypress Sts., Greensboro, North Carolina
- Coordinates: 36°8′23″N 79°46′45″W
- Area: 27 acres (11 ha)
- Built: 1920
- Architectural style: Bungalow/craftsman, Gable-end
- MPS: Greensboro MPS
- NRHP reference No.: 92000176
- Added to NRHP: April 3, 1992

White Oak New Town Historic District is a historic mill village and national historic district located at Greensboro, Guilford County, North Carolina. The district encompasses 164 contributing buildings built in the 1920s. They include 100 hollow-tile-walled, one- and two-story, stuccoed Bungalow style houses and 64 car sheds.

It was listed on the National Register of Historic Places in 1992.
