= Galaxy Public School =

School in Nepal

Location
- Gyaneshwar, Kathmandu; Nepal
- 27.7082521°N 85.3303915°E

Information
- Type: Coeducational
- Motto: Love and Service
- Established: 1986
- Chairperson: Mrs. Geeta Chettri Rana
- Principal: Mrs. Surina Gurung
- Enrollment: 2500
- Nickname: G.P.S./Galaxy
- Website: www.galaxy.edu.np

Galaxy Public is located in Gyaneshwar, Kathmandu, Nepal and educates over 2,500 students. Established in 1986, it offers education across levels of Kindergarten to Secondary Education Examination level, along with 10+2 in Science and Commerce specialization.
