= Southside, Greensboro, North Carolina =

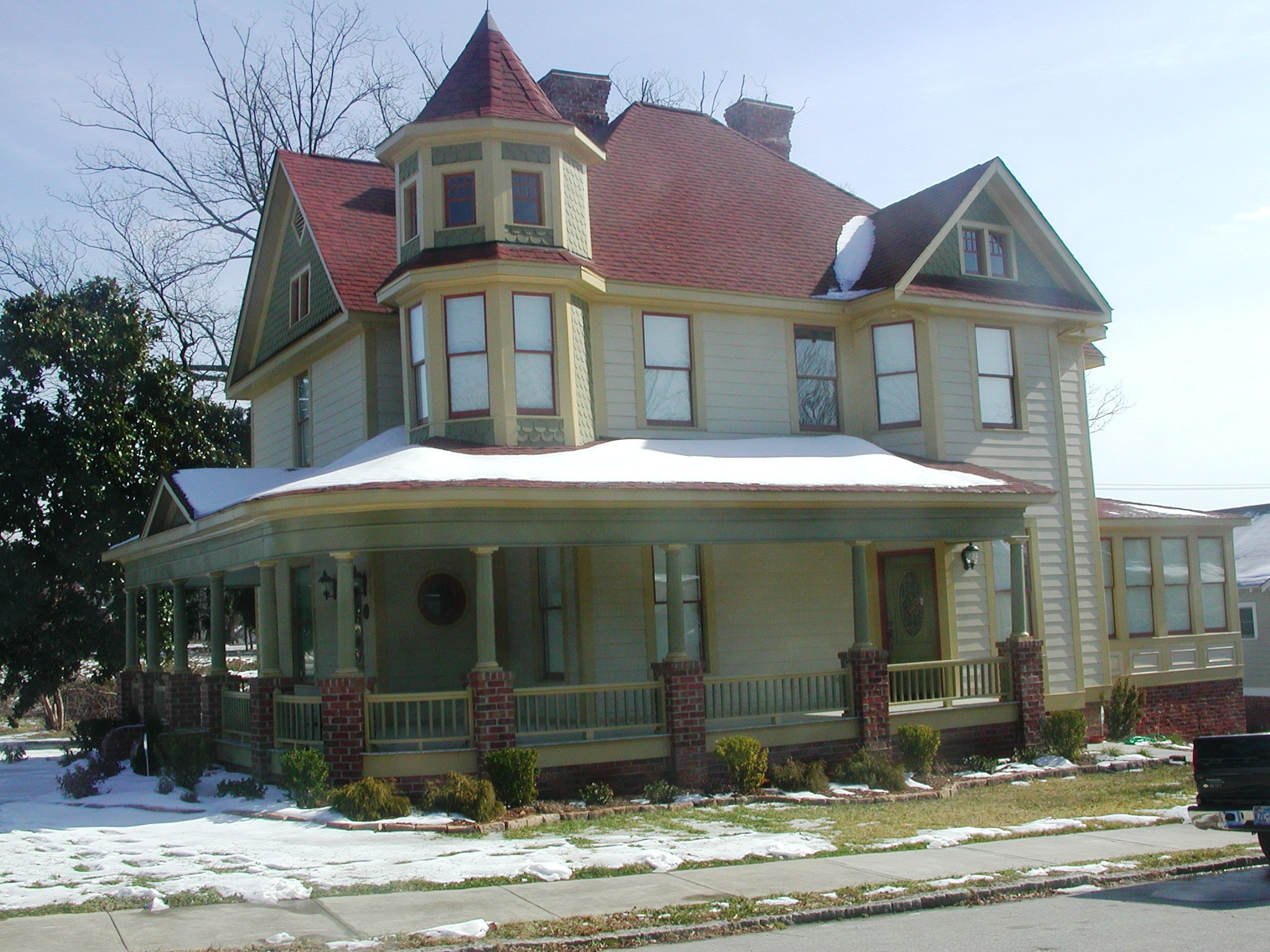
Typical nineteenth-century residence in Southside

live-work townhomes in Southside

townhomes in Southside

Southside is an urban neighborhood in the south central section of the United States city of Greensboro, North Carolina. Southside has also been known as the Ol' Asheboro neighborhood, Arlington Park, the Asheboro Street neighborhood, and the South Greensboro neighborhood, Gorrell Street Neighborhood Association. Located in downtown Greensboro, its streets are lined with historic Queen Anne mansions and bungalows, complemented by new development that has attracted a diverse population. The downtown neighborhood has received several national awards including the 2003 Outstanding Planning Award, the 2004 National Award for Smart Growth and in 2005 the Sierra Club named the Southside Neighborhood in the top 12 as one of America's best new developments

== Geography ==
=== Boundaries ===
Southside is roughly bounded by the following:

- on the north by Southern Railway tracks;
- on the west by Arlington Street;
- on the east by Bennett Street; and
- on the south by Gate City Blvd.

=== ZIP code ===
The 27406 ZIP code corresponds entirely or almost entirely with Southside.

== History ==
Dame's Chicken & Waffles Restaurant

studio apartment in CityView Apartments

water fountain at Southside Square

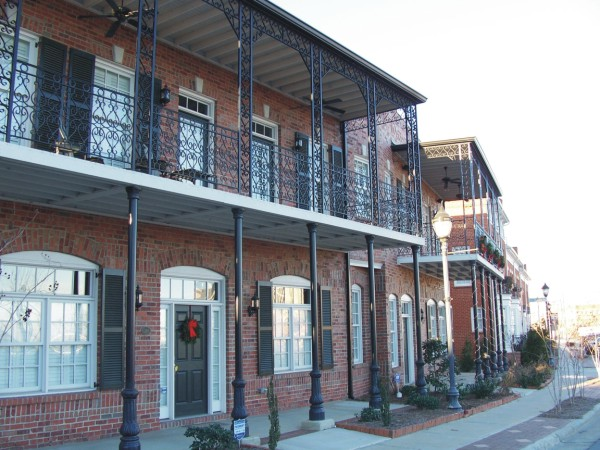
New Orleans style townhome at Southside

Charleston style home at Southside

South Greensboro and Arlington Park include some of Greensboro's most extensive and intact concentrations of late-nineteenth- and early-twentieth century dwellings, which led to their listing in 1991 on the National Register of Historic Places as the South Greensboro Historic District. Set on small city lots, these houses display a variety of styles and forms popular elsewhere in the city and across North Carolina. Of particular note are the Italianate- and Queen Anne-style dwellings, both small and large, and later bungalows.

According to an article in Greensoro's New North State (February 29, 1872), South Greensboro's Asheboro Street was "fast becoming one of the most beautiful streets in the city and a very desirable place to live. We learn there is great demand for building purposes in this street." This demand was largely limited to Asheboro Street itself, for maps of 1879 and 1882 show relatively little development off it. Few of the houses from the 1870s still stand. The William Fields House at 447 Arlington Street at the edge of Arlington Park is one survivor. The Italianate-style George S. Kestler House at 437 Arlington was built in 1876. In 1899 William C. Bain was living in the large, two-and-a-half-story, Queen Anne-style residence at 739 Plott Street. Alphonso N. Perkins occupied the striking Queen Anne/Colonial Revival-style house at 640 Asheboro Street.[1]

The neighborhood is home to numerous institutions, such as the Bennett College for Women, Skenes Chapel (formerly Asheboro Street Friends Meetinghouse), and several local architectural landmarks such as the William Fields House.

In 1996 the Greensboro City Council approved a bond package that included funding for the redevelopment of the neighborhood and an intensive community planning process followed. This resulted in the Southside Plan—a blueprint that follows the principles of "new urbanism." Existing historic houses are being renovated for owner-occupied residences. New housing features structures that are closely spaced and oriented toward the street with wide front porches. Sidewalks, period street lights, and other amenities add to the turn-of-the century ambiance. New construction also includes townhouses and commercial buildings surrounding a central park-like square. In December 2007, construction on the first two buildings of an eight building apartment complex called CityView Apartments was complete.

Tower Homes at Southside

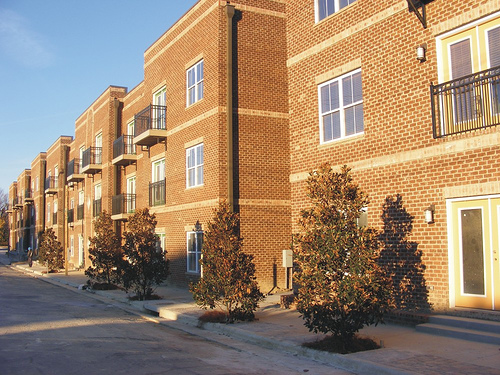
CityView Apartments at Southside

== Parks and public spaces ==
- Southside Square

== Other notable civic institutions ==
- Bennett College
- Nettie Coad Apartments (former David B. Caldwell School)
- Skenes Chapel

== On the National Register of Historic Places ==
South Greensboro National Register Historic District, 1991
