= Kalimati fruit and vegetable market =

Bazaar in Kathmandu

Kalimati fruit and vegetable market (Nepali:कालिमाटी फलफुल तथा तरकारी बजार) is the biggest wholesale market for agricultural products in Nepal. It is located in the capital, Kathmandu. The market is managed and run by the Kalimati Fruit and Vegetable Market Development. The market was established in 1987 as a wholesale center at Kalimati by the Nepal government using United Nations Capital Development Fund with a budget of NPR 4.6 million. The sellers have to sell minimum of five kilograms in the market. There is also a retailing market where small traders can sell their products. There are 425 wholesale, 65 retail and 27 fish shops in the market.

== History ==
The market was established in 15 Aswin 2043 BS by the Food and Agricultural Market Service Department. Later due to increase in demand, the infrastructure of the market was upgraded by Nepal government and UNCDF. In 2051 BS, a bill was passed to run the market. In 2058 BS, the bill was amended to regulate the market under federal government.

== See also ==
- Agriculture in Nepal
