= Gyaneshwar, Kathmandu =

Gyaneshwar
- Neighborhood
- Location in Kathmandu
- Coordinates: 27.7102°N 85.3330°E
- Country: Nepal
- Province: Bagmati Province
- District: Kathmandu
- Postal Code: 44600

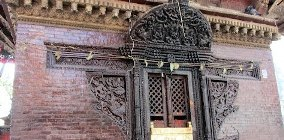
Gyaneshwor Mahadev temple

Gyaneshwor is one of the central neighborhoods in the city of Kathmandu, Nepal. It is named after the ancient temple of Gyaneshwor Mahadev & Bhairavsthan located there. It is a multi-cultural residential area with good facilities.

Some major establishments located there are the German embassy to Nepal, in Gyaneshwor Marg, USEF, Mega Bank, Kaveri Inn, Valley Petrol Station, Cafe 98', Galaxy Public School, Mahendra Bhawan School etc.

The well-known International Primary School, closed in 2011, was also located in Gyaneshwor, where multiple generations of Nepalis from all over Kathmandu started their early education.

The football field of Sano Gaucharan is located on the northern side of Gyaneshwor. It is one of the best areas to live in Kathmandu.
