= Old Javanese calendar =

Ancient Javanese dating system

A calendar in Old Javanese style for 2025 (PDF).

Old Javanese calendar (or Ancient Javanese calendar) was a dating system previously used in inscriptions from various kingdom eras, starting from the Medang Kingdom up to the Majapahit Empire. This dating system was widely used, particularly for writing inscriptions in Java and Bali. Unlike the present-day Javanese and Balinese calendar system, the Old Javanese calendar incorporates a greater number of chronological elements (features more dating components). It can be said that the Old Javanese calendar is a synthesis of the Hindu Indian calendar, western zodiac and pre-existing indigenous Javanese calendrical traditions.

== Calendar Components ==
In the inscriptions of the kingdoms in Java and Bali (from the Medang Kingdom era up to the end of Majapahit) up to 15 chronological elements were used.

#	Element	Meaning	Designations (see below)	Approximate Duration in Days
1	Warṣa	year	-	365
2	Māsa	month	12	30
3	Tithī	lunar day	15	1
4	Pakṣa	fortnight	2	15
5	Wāra: pañcawāra ṣaḍwāra saptawāra	solar day: 5-day cycle 6-day cycle 7-day cycle	5; 6; 7	1
6	Wuku	week (7 days in a 5×6×7=210-day cycle)	30	7
7	Grahacāra	Sun movement	8	¹/₈ (3 hours)
8	Nakṣatra	lunar mansion	27 (13° 20′)	1
9	Dewatā	deity	27	1
10	Maṇḍala	stellar group	4	1 to 4
11	Yoga	Sun/Moon combination	27	1
12	Muhūrtta	hour	30	¹/₃₀ (48 minutes)
13	Parwweṣa	lunar node movement	9 (20°) or 7	365
14	Karaṇa	half lunar day	11	¹/₂ (12 hours)
15	Rāśi	lunar zodiac sign	12	2

Not all elements were used in every inscription, but typically more than five chronological elements are present. Tithī/Pakṣa, Wāra, Nakṣatra, Yoga and Karaṇa were considered the most important elements; they make up the pañcāṅgam.

=== Year (warṣa) ===
The year (which in Old Javanese is referred to as Warsa) in the Old Javanese dating system often utilizes the Saka Year; however, some existing inscriptions show the use of the Sanjaya Year in their chronology.

=== Month (māsa) ===
Animation that illustrates Māsa.

The month, which in Old Javanese is referred to as Wulan or Masa, was written in ancient inscriptions using names derived from Sanskrit months. The names of the months listed in these inscriptions are: Caitra, Waiśākha, Jyeṣṭha, Āṣāḍha, Śrāvaṇa, Bhādrapāda, Āśvina (or Āśuji), Kārttika, Mārgaśīrṣa, Pauṣa (or Poṣya), Māgha, and Phālguna. The Old Javanese calendar had years that consisted of either twelve or thirteen months. The system itself utilized a solar year for calculating one year, while the months were calculated using lunar movements, making it a lunisolar system.

Months of the Saka Calendar (Old Javanese) and Gregorian Equivalents
No.	Saka Month (Old Javanese Name)	Corresponding Gregorian Months
1	Caitra	March – April
2	Waiśākha / Vaiśākha	April – May
3	Jyeṣṭa / Jyaiṣṭha	May – June
4	Āṣāḍha / Āṣāḍha	June – July
5	Śrāwaṇa	July – August
6	Bhādrawāda / Bhādrapada	August – September
7	Asuji / Āświna	September – October
8	Kārttika / Kārtika	October – November
9	Mārggaśīrsa / Mārgaśīrṣa	November – December
10	Posya / Pauṣa	December – January
11	Māgha	January – February
12	Phālguna	February – March

Example Chart of Intercalary Months in the Saka Calendar (2020–2037)
Western Year (Approx.)	Saka Year	Number of Months	Intercalary Month Added (IAST)
2020	1942	13	Āśvina
2021	1943	12	—
2022	1944	12	—
2023	1945	13	Śrāvaṇa
2024	1946	12	—
2025	1947	12	—
2026	1948	13	Jyeṣṭha
2027	1949	12	—
2028	1950	12	—
2029	1951	13	Caitra
2030	1952	12	—
2031	1953	13	Bhādrapada
2032	1954	12	—
2033	1955	12	—
2034	1956	13	Āṣāḍha
2035	1957	12	—
2036	1958	12	—
2037	1959	13	Jyeṣṭha

The calendar for the Saka year 1945 (2023) demonstrates a key feature of the Old Javanese system: the addition of an intercalary month. The external image here shows that the extra month, named Punah Śrāwaṇa, was inserted immediately following the regular month of Śrāwaṇa.

=== Lunar Day (tithī) and Lunar Fortnight (pakṣa) ===
Phases of the Moon. New moon called Pañcadaśī Kṛṣṇapakṣa, full moon called Pañcadaśī Śuklapakṣa

The 30 Tīthī (Lunar day) are grouped into two halves called Pakṣa (lunar fortnights).

Tithi (Lunar Day) Names
Tithi Number	Śuklapakṣa (Waxing Fortnight)	Kṛṣṇapakṣa (Waning Fortnight)
1	Pratipadā	Pratipadā
2	Dvitīyā	Dvitīyā
3	Tṛtīyā	Tṛtīyā
4	Caturthī	Caturthī
5	Pañcamī	Pañcamī
6	Ṣaṣṭhī	Ṣaṣṭhī
7	Saptamī	Saptamī
8	Aṣṭamī	Aṣṭamī
9	Navamī	Navamī
10	Daśamī	Daśamī
11	Ekādaśī	Ekādaśī
12	Dvādaśī	Dvādaśī
13	Trayodaśī	Trayodaśī
14	Caturdaśī	Caturdaśī
15	Pañcadaśī (Full Moon)	Pañcadaśī (New Moon)

Note on Tithi 15: The 15th Tithi is called Pūrṇimā (Full Moon) in Śuklapakṣa and Amāvasyā (New Moon/Dark Moon) in Kṛṣṇapakṣa.

=== Day (wāra) ===
A day, or Wāra in Old Javanese dating terminology, is a unit of time that begins at sunrise and lasts until the next sunrise. In the Old Javanese dating system, the day (wara) is organized into several concurrent cycles: the 5-day cycle (Pancawara), the 6-day cycle (Sadwara), and the 7-day cycle (Saptawara).

==== Five Day Cycle (pañcawāra) ====
Comparison of Pañcawāra Names
Pasaran (Pañcawāra)	Old Javanese Name
Paing	Pahiṅ (pa)
Pon	Pon (po)
Wagé	Wage/Wagai (wa)
Kliwon	Kaliwwan (ka)
Legi	Umanis (u)

==== Six Day Cycle (ṣaḍwāra ) ====
The 6-Day Cycle (Ṣaḍwāra)
No.	Paringkĕlan/Ṣaḍwāra Name
1	Tuṅle/Tuṅlay/Tuṅleh (tu)
2	Haryaṅ (ha)
3	Wurukuṅ (wu)
4	Paniruan/Paniron (pa)
5	Was (wa)
6	Mawulu (ma)

==== Seven Day Cycle (saptawāra) ====
The 7-Day Cycle (Saptawāra)
No.	Day (Saptawāra)	Old Javanese Name
1.	Sunday	Āditya (ā)/Raditya
2.	Monday	Soma (so)/Candra (ca)
3.	Tuesday	Aṅgara (aṅ)
4.	Wednesday	Budha (bu)
5.	Thursday	Wṛhaspati (wṛ)
6.	Friday	Śukra (śu)
7.	Saturday	Śanaiścara/Śaneścara (śa)/Tumpak

=== Week (wuku) ===
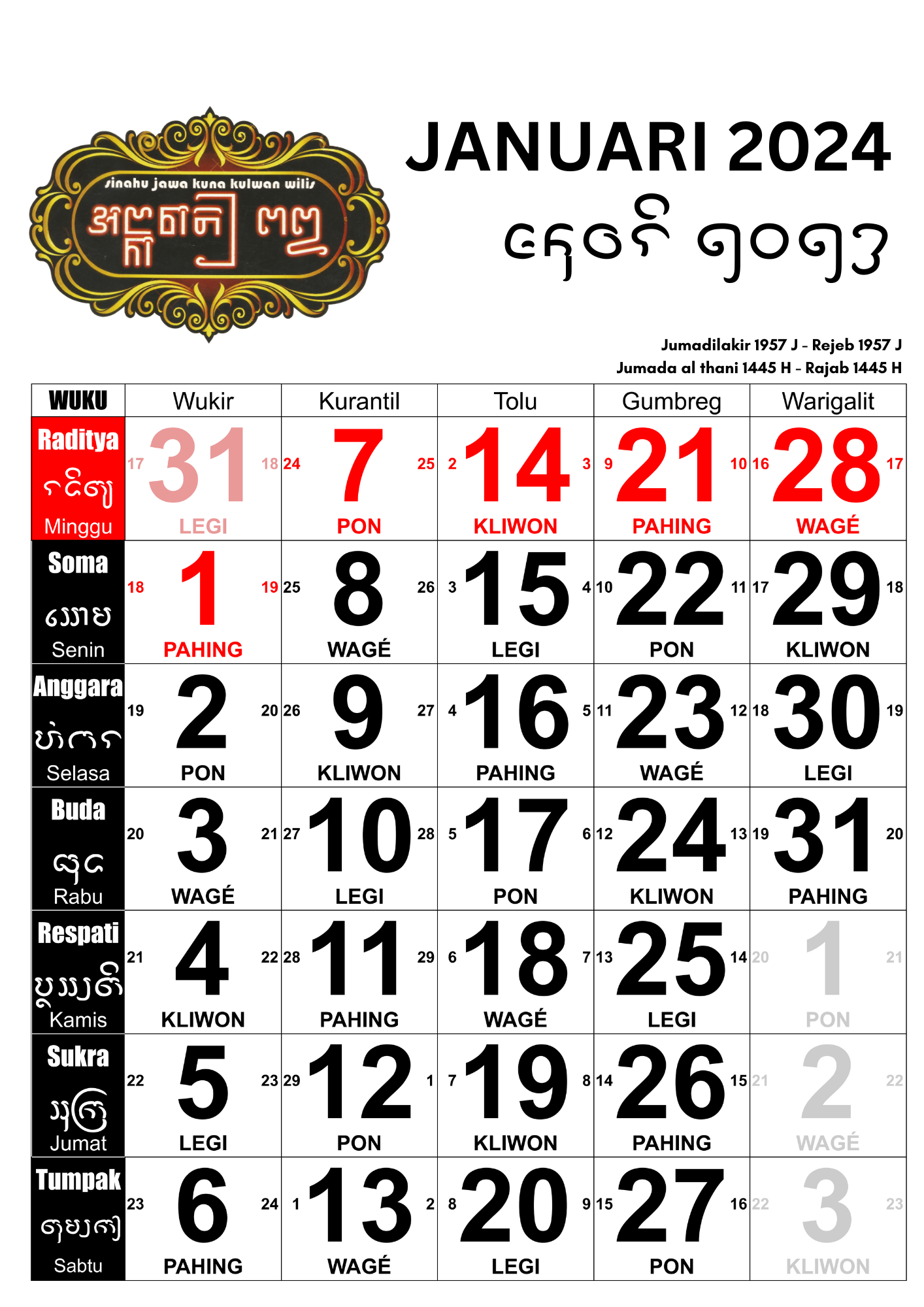
The use of the Pasaran/Pancawara (5-day cycle) and Wuku (210-day cycle) remains common today, particularly in calendars circulated throughout the Java region.

The Wuku is a chronological cycle derived from the combination of the Sadwāra (6-day cycle), Pañcawāra (5-day cycle), and Saptawāra (7-day cycle). This combination results in a 210-day cycle, which occurs once or twice a year. The 210-day cycle is grouped into 30 distinct wuku, with each wuku lasting 7 days and defined by a unique combination of the 6,5,7 day-cycles. Along with Sadwāra and Pañcawāra, the wuku is believed to be an indigenous Javanese dating element. For example, the date "Ma Ka Bu" (Mawulu Kliwon Budha) marks the 144th day in the 210-day cycle and belongs to Wuku Mahatal (the 21st wuku).

Starting Days of the 30 Wuku (210-Day Cycle)
No.	Wuku Name	Starting Day (of 210-Day Cycle)	Saptawara (7-day cycle)	Sadwara (6-day cycle: Paringkelan)	Pancawara (5-day cycle: Pasaran)
1	Sinta	1	Sunday	Tunglé	Pahing
2	Landep	8	Sunday	Aryang	Wagé
3	Wukir	15	Sunday	Wurukung	Legi
4	Kurantil	22	Sunday	Paningron	Pon
5	Tolu	29	Sunday	Uwas	Kliwon
6	Gumbrèg	36	Sunday	Mawulu	Pahing
7	Wariga ning Wariga (Warigalit)	43	Sunday	Tunglé	Wagé
8	Wariga (Warigagung)	50	Sunday	Aryang	Legi
9	Julung Wangi	57	Sunday	Wurukung	Pon
10	Sungsang	64	Sunday	Paningron	Kliwon
11	Dungulan (Galungan)	71	Sunday	Uwas	Pahing
12	Kuningan	78	Sunday	Mawulu	Wagé
13	Langkir	85	Sunday	Tunglé	Legi
14	Madasih (Mandasiya)	92	Sunday	Aryang	Pon
15	Julung Pujut	99	Sunday	Wurukung	Kliwon
16	Pahang	106	Sunday	Paningron	Pahing
17	Kuruwulut	113	Sunday	Uwas	Wagé
18	Marakih (Marakeh)	120	Sunday	Mawulu	Legi
19	Tambir	127	Sunday	Tunglé	Pon
20	Madangkungan	134	Sunday	Aryang	Kliwon
21	Mahatal (Maktal)	141	Sunday	Wurukung	Pahing
22	Wuyai (Wuye)	148	Sunday	Paningron	Wagé
23	Manahil	155	Sunday	Uwas	Legi
24	Prangbakat	162	Sunday	Mawulu	Pon
25	Bala	169	Sunday	Tunglé	Kliwon
26	Wugu	176	Sunday	Aryang	Pahing
27	Wayang	183	Sunday	Wurukung	Wagé
28	Kulawu	190	Sunday	Paningron	Legi
29	Dukut	197	Sunday	Uwas	Pon
30	Watu Gunung	204	Sunday	Mawulu	Kliwon

=== Path of the Sun (grahacāra) ===
The term Graha Cāra is derived from two Sanskrit words: graha meaning 'planet', and cāra meaning 'path, route, or journey'. Therefore, graha cāra signifies the 'path/journey of the planet.' Which planet is being referred to? Considering the consistency with other elements of the dating system, the 'path of the planet' refers to the Sun (Sūrya). From a geocentric perspective, the Sun revolves around the Earth, rising in the east and setting in the west, then reappearing in the east the following day, and so on. Thus, graha cāra indicates the daily journey of the Sun over 24 hours (a solar day/wara).

There are eight directions (or positions) that refer to the Sun's position:

Graha Cāra	English Name	Time Range
Purwāstha	East	04:30 – 07:30
Aiśānyastha	Northeast	07:30 – 10:30
Uttarāstha	North	10:30 – 13:30
Bāyabyastha	Northwest	13:30 – 16:30
Paścimastha	West	16:30 – 19:30
Nairītistha	Southwest	19:30 – 22:30
Dakṣiṇāstha	South	22:30 – 01:30
Āgneyastha	Southeast	01:30 – 04:30

Since one solar day equals 24 hours, each of these eight positions has a time duration of 3 hours. Because the Sun rises in the east, which marks the start of a new day, the position must begin in the east (Purwāstha), which is approximately from 04:30 to 07:30 in the morning. Therefore, Nairītistha graha cāra means the 'position of the Sun is in the southwest,' which corresponds to the time between 19:30 and 22:30 (at night).

=== Lunar mansion (nakṣatra) and Deity (dewatā) ===
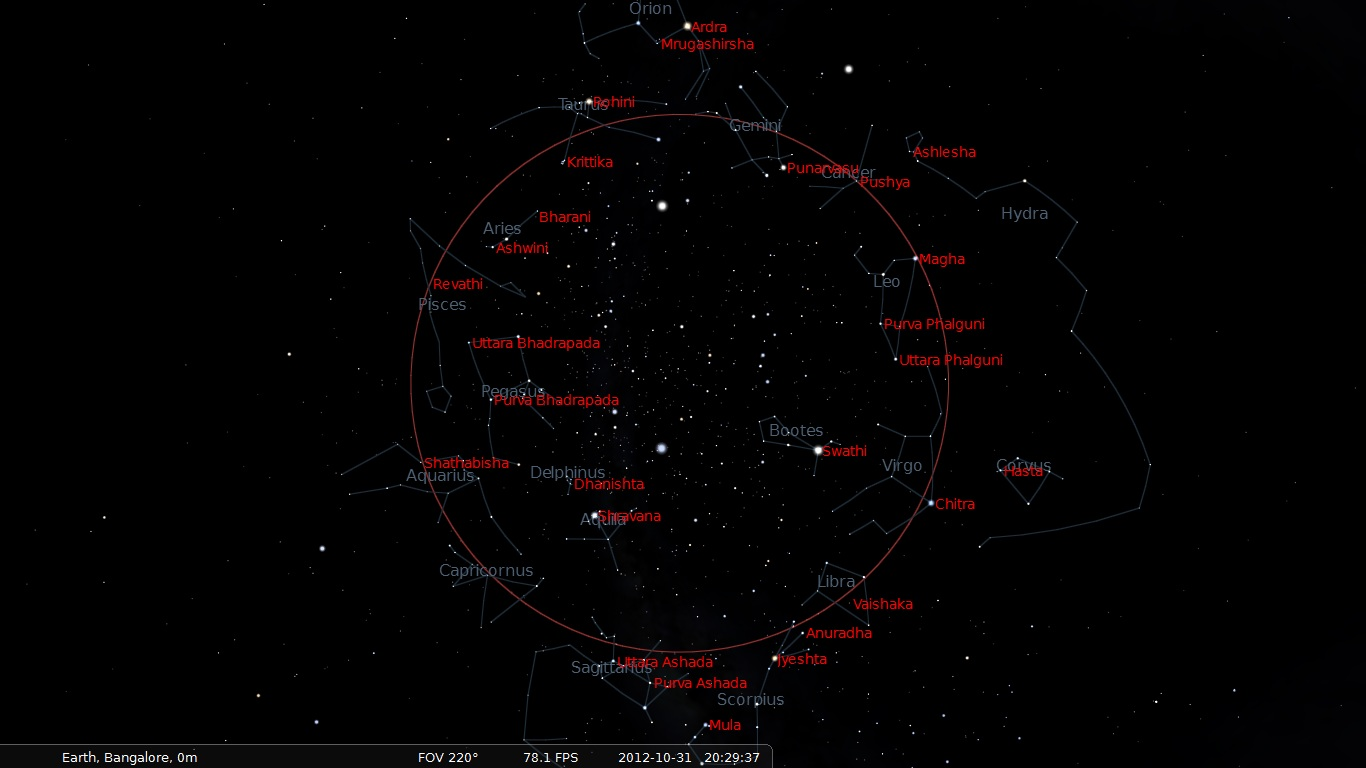
Positions of the Nakshatras

Nakṣatra & Dewatā always come in pairs. Nakṣatra simply means a group of stars. In Hindu astrology, this term almost always refers to 27 specific groups of stars or constellations located along the Sun's path (the Ecliptic). All planets, including the Moon and the Sun, pass along the Ecliptic and align with one of the 27 nakṣatra.

The 27 Nakṣatras and Their Corresponding Gods
No.	Nákṣatra (Lunar Mansion)	Dewatā (Gods/Deity)
1	Áświnī	Áświno
2	Bharaṇī	Yama
3	Kṛtikā	Dahana
4	Rohiṇī	Prajāpati
5	Mṛgaśira	Śaśī
6	Ādrā	Rudra
7	Punarwwasu	Aditi
8	Puṣya	Jiwa
9	Āśleṣa	Nāga
10	Māgha	Pitara
11	Purwwa Phalguni	Yoni
12	Uttara Phalguni	Aryyama
13	Hasta	Dinakṛt
14	Citrā	Twaṣṭā
15	Swāti	Pawana
16	Wiśākha	Cakra
17	Ānuradha	Mitra
18	Jyeṣṭa	Śakragni
19	Mūla	Nairiti
20	Purwwāṣāḍha	Áświ
21	Uttarāṣāḍha	Wiṣwa
22	Śrāwaṇa	Brahma
23	Dhaniṣṭa	Wiṣṇu
24	Śatabhiṣa	Baruṇa
25	Purwwa Bhadrawāda	Ajapāda
26	Uttara Bhadrawāda	Ahir Budhna
27	Rewati	Puṣāṇa

=== Maṇḍala ===
Maṇḍala originally means consecrated circle or region. The Maṇḍalas are four regions into which stars (Nakṣatras) are grouped.

- Mahendra (east): 4 Rohiṇi, 17 Ānuradha, 18 Jyeṣṭa, 21 Uttarāṣāḍha, Abhijit (intercalary Nakṣatra), 22 Śrāwaṇa, 23 Dhaniṣṭa
- Agneya (south-east): 2 Bharaṇī, 3 Kṛttikā, 8 Puṣya, 10 Māgha, 11 Purwwa Phalgunī, 16 Wiśākha, 25 Purwwa Bhadrawāda
- Bāruna (west): 6 Ādrā, 9 Āśleṣa, 19 Mūla, 20 Purwwāṣāḍha, 24 Satabhiṣa, 26 Uttara Bhadrawāda, 27 Rewati
- Bāyabya (north-west): 1 Áświnī, 5 Mṛgaśira, 7 Punarwwaśu, 12 Uttara Phalgunī, 13 Hasta, 14 Citrā, 15 Swāti.

=== Yoga ===
Orbital simulation illustrating yoga

No.	Name
1	Wiṣkambha
2	Prīti
3	Ayuṣman
4	Śobhagya
5	Śobhana
6	Atīganda
7	Sukarmma
8	Dhṛti
9	Śūla
10	Gaṇḍa
11	Wṛddhi
12	Dhṛwa
13	Wyatighata
14	Harṣaṇa
15	Bajra
16	Siddhi
17	Wyātipāta
18	Wariyān
19	Parigha
20	Śiwa
21	Siddha
22	Sadya
23	Śubha
24	Śukla
25	Brahmā
26	Indra
27	Wedhṛti

=== Hour (muhūrtta) ===
Muhūrtta (sometimes write Muhurta, Muhurtta) is the smallest unit of time in the Old Javanese dating system. One solar day (wāra) is divided into 30 muhūrtta. Thus, one muhūrtta is equivalent to 48 minutes.

Muhūrtta Time Calculation (Assuming Sunrise at 06:00)
Muhūrtta 1–15 (Daytime)			Muhūrtta 16–30 (Nighttime)		
No.	Name	Time Range	No.	Name	Time Range
1.	Rudra	06:00 – 06:48	16.	Giriśa	18:00 – 18:48
2.	Āhi	06:48 – 07:36	17.	Ājapāda	18:48 – 19:36
3.	Mitra	07:36 – 08:24	18.	Āhiir Budnya	19:36 – 20:24
4.	Pitṛ	08:24 – 09:12	19.	Pusya	20:24 – 21:12
5.	Wasu	09:12 – 10:00	20.	Āświni	21:12 – 22:00
6.	Wārāha	10:00 – 10:48	21.	Yama	22:00 – 22:48
7.	Wiśwedewā	10:48 – 11:36	22.	Āgni	22:48 – 23:36
8.	Widi	11:36 – 12:24	23.	Widātr	23:36 – 00:24
9.	Sutamukī	12:24 – 13:12	24.	Kanda	00:24 – 01:12
10.	Puruhūta	13:12 – 14:00	25.	Āditi	01:12 – 02:00
11.	Wāhinī	14:00 – 14:48	26.	Jīwa	02:00 – 02:48
12.	Naktanakarā	14:48 – 15:36	27.	Wiṣṇu	02:48 – 03:36
13.	Waruṇa	15:36 – 16:24	28.	Dyumadgadyuti	03:36 – 04:24
14.	Āryyamana	16:24 – 17:12	29.	Brahma	04:24 – 05:12
15.	Baga	17:12 – 18:00	30.	Samudra	05:12 – 06:00

=== Regent of the node (parwweṣa) ===
Parwweṣa means ruler of the astronomical node. Ancient Javanese astrology divides the movement of the two lunar nodes into nine or seven segments (parwwa).

9 Parwweṣas
No.	Name
1	Śaśi (Iśana)
2	Kuwera
3	Brahmā (Bayu)
4	Baruṇa
5	Nairiti(ya)
6	Yama
7	Agni
8	Indra
9	Kala

7 Parwweṣas
No.	Name
1	Brahmā
2	Śaśi
3	Indra
4	Kuwera
5	Baruṇa
6	Agni
7	Yama

=== Half lunar day (karaṇa) ===
Karana (sometimes write Karaṇa) is a half lunar day, equivalent to half a tithi. A full lunar month is composed of 60 karaṇas, but only 11 distinct names are used.

The 11 names of the Karaṇa are: Kiṃstughna; Wawa, Walawa, Kaulawa, Taitila, Gara, Waṇija, Wiṣṭi; Śakuni, Catuṣpāda, and Nāga.

The first karaṇa ends at the midpoint of the tithi, and the second karaṇa ends when the tithi is completed.

The naming convention is as follows:

1. The first tithi (1st śuklapakṣa) begins with the Kiṃstughna karaṇa and ends with the Wawa karaṇa.
2. The second tithi (2nd śuklapakṣa) up to the 29th tithi (14th kṛṣṇapakṣa) consists of a combination of the paired karaṇas: Wawa, Walawa, Kaulawa, Taitila, Gara, Waṇija, and Wiṣṭi.
3. The second karaṇa of the 29th tithi is Śakuni. Subsequently, the last tithi (15th kṛṣṇapakṣa) begins with the Catuṣpāda karaṇa and ends with the Nāga karaṇa

=== Zodiac (rāśi) ===
Unlike the Western (Tropical) zodiac, which uses the Sun as its primary parameter resulting in 12 zodiac signs over the course of a year, the utilization of the zodiac (rāśi) in the Old Javanese calendar is based on the lunar cycle. Consequently, the duration of each zodiac sign in the Old Javanese calendar is significantly shorter. For instance, the Aries zodiac sign (Meṣa) in the Old Javanese calendar begins on November 4, 2025, at 14:05 (2:05 PM) and concludes on November 6, 2025, at 13:17 (1:17 PM).

The Twelve Zodiac Signs (Rāśi) name
No.	Old Javanese Name	Meaning	English Name
1	Meṣa	Ram	Aries
2	Wṛṣabha	Bull	Taurus
3	Mithuna	Pair / Twins	Gemini
4	Karkaṭa	Crab	Cancer
5	Siṅha	Lion	Leo
6	Kanyā	Maiden / Girl	Virgo
7	Tulā	Balance / Scale	Libra
8	Wṛścika / Mṛcchika	Scorpion	Scorpio
9	Dhanu	Bow and Arrow	Sagittarius
10	Makara	Sea Creature (Sea Dragon)	Capricorn
11	Kumbha	Water-Jar	Aquarius
12	Mīna	Fish	Pisces

== Example of the chronological notation (calendar element) used in inscriptions. ==
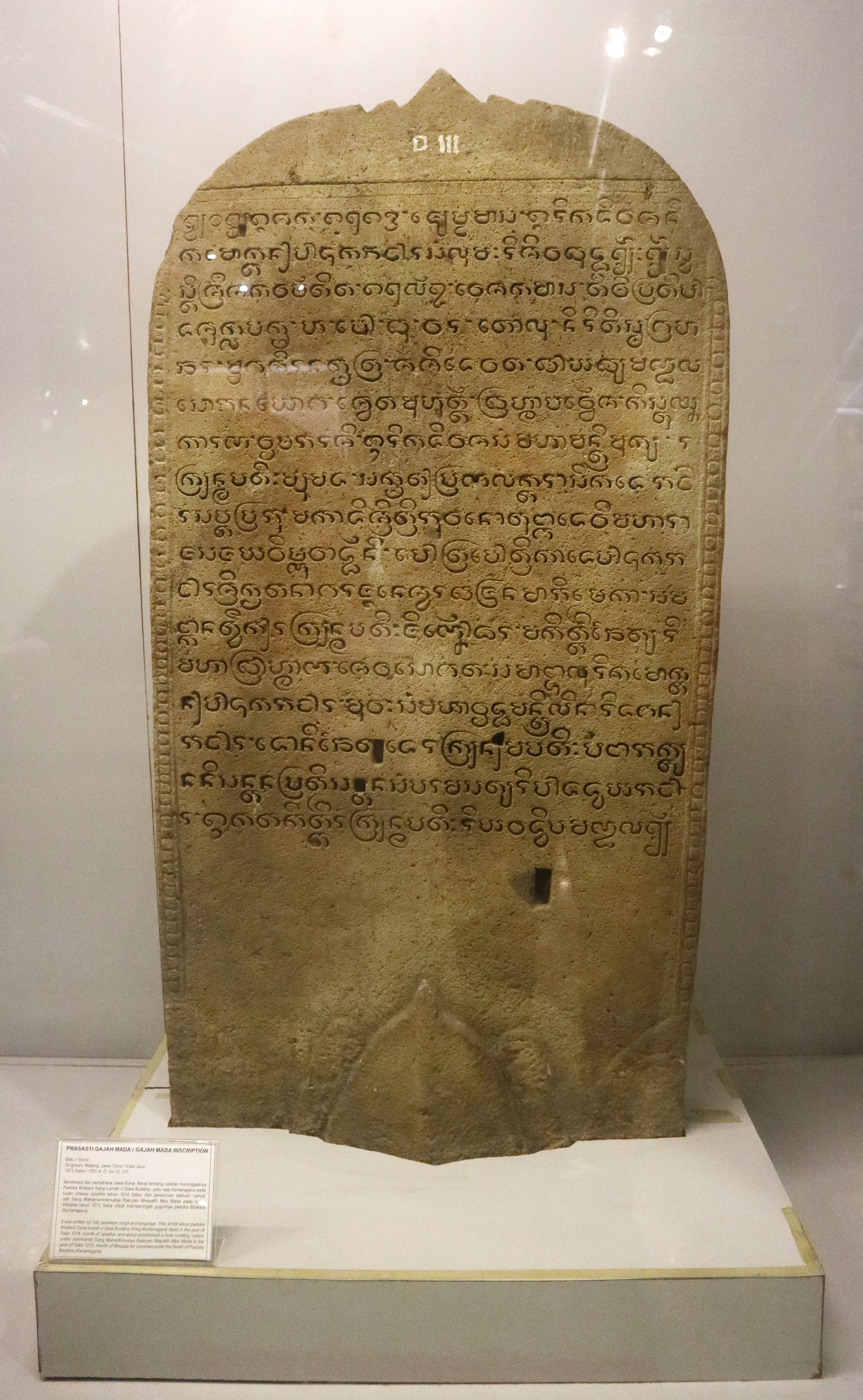
This article uses the Gajah Mada Inscription as an example of the Old Javanese calendar elements.

Analysis of Chronological Notation in Inscription Transcript (meaning 27 April 1351)
No.	Inscription Transcript	Calendar Element
1.	/⚬/ i śaka ; 1214 ; jyeṣṭa māsa irika diwaśani	Year, Month (Māsa)
2.	kamoktan pāduka bhaṭāra sang lumah ring śiwa buddha /:/ swa-	—
3.	sti śrī śaka warṣatīta ; 1273 ; weśakamāsa ; tithi pratipā-	Year (Warṣa), Month (Māsa), Tithi (Lunar Day) ...
4.	da śuklapakṣa ; ha[ryaṅ] ; po[n] ; bu[dha] ; wara ; tolu ; niritistha graha-	and Fortnight (Pakṣa), 6-/5-/7-Day Cycle (Wara), Week (Wuku, 210-Day Cycle)
5.	cara ; mṛgāśira nakṣatra ; śāśidewata ; bāyabyamaṇḍala ;	Path of the Sun (Grahacara), Lunar Mansion (Nakṣatra), Deity (Dewata), Circle (Maṇḍala)
6.	sobhanayoga ; śweta muhurtta ; brahmāparwweśa ; kistughna	Sun/Moon Combination (Yoga), Hour (Muhūrtta), Regent of the Node (Parwweṣa)
7.	kāraṇa ; wṛṣabharāśi ; irika diwaśa sang mahāmantrimukya ; ra-	Half-Tithi (Karaṇa), Zodiac (Rāśi)

== Example of the chronological notation (calendar element) used in present day. ==
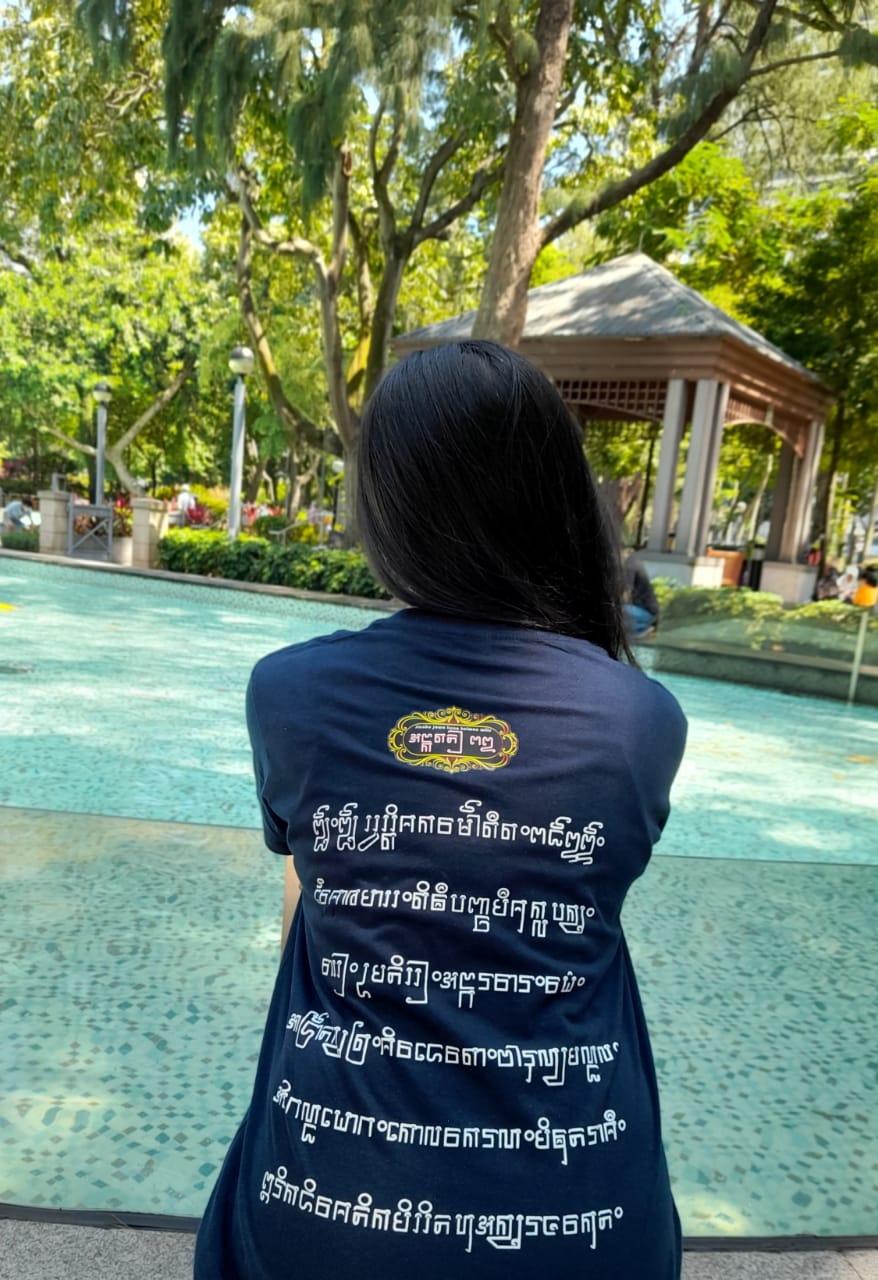
A person wearing a T-shirt featuring a date given in Old Javanese style and Kawi script.

Kawi Script Transcription and Old Javanese Calendar Elements (meaning 25 April 2023)
No.	T-Shirt Transcript	Translation
1.	/⚬/ swasti śaka warṣātīta ' 1945 '	/⚬/ Hail! Elapsed Śaka year 1945,
2.	waiśākha māsa ' tithī pañcamī śukla pakṣa '	month of Waiśākha, fifth day of the waxing moon,
3.	wās ' umanis ' āṅgara wāra ' wayaṃ '	Wās, Umanis, Tuesday, [wuku] Wayang,
4.	ārdra nakṣatra ' śiwa dewatā ' bāruṇya maṇḍala '	lunar mansion Ārdra, deity Dewatā, maṇḍala Bāruṇya,
5.	atigaṇḍa yoga ' kolawa karaṇa ' mithuna rāśī '	yoga Atigaṇḍa, karaṇa Kolawa, zodiac sign Gemini,
6.	irika diwaśani kami sinahu akṣara jawa kuna	at that time we learn the ancient Javanese alphabet

== Legacy ==
Although the Old Javanese calendar is no longer utilized, its core components remain integrated into the modern Balinese and Javanese calendar systems.

- The Balinese calendar continues to use the Saka year numbering system inherited from the Old Javanese calendar. Other elements preserved from the older system include the wuku (the 210-day cycle), the pasaran (the 5-day cycle, or Pancawara), the paringkelan (the 6-day cycle, or Sadwara), and the 7-day cycle (Saptawara).
- The present-day Javanese calendar retains the wuku (210-day cycle), the pasaran (Pancawara), and the 7-day cycle (Saptawara) from the Old Javanese calendar. Some printed versions of the Javanese calendar also retain the Sadwara (6-day cycle) within their system.
- Some small communities on the island of Java still use (or at least revive) the Old Javanese calendar today. As an example, the external image here shows an Old Javanese calendar for the Saka year 1945 (2023).
