= Panjika =

Hindu astronomical almanac

The Panjika (IAST: Pañjikā; Assamese: পঞ্জিকা; Bengali: পঞ্জিকা; Maithili: পাঁজিক, पाँजिक; Nepali: पञ्जिका; Odia: ପଞ୍ଜିକା) is the Hindu astronomical almanac, published in Assamese, Bengali, Maithili, Nepali and Odia languages and colloquially known as Panji (IAST: Pāñji; Assamese: পাঁজি; Bengali: পাঞ্জি; Odia: ପାଞ୍ଜି). In other parts of India it is called panchangam.

== Bengali panjika ==
Cover of a Bengali panjika. Bengali Panjikas typically have dark pink front covers

There are two schools of panjika-makers in Bengal – Driksiddhanta (Bishuddha Siddhanta Panjika) and Odriksiddhanta (Gupta Press, PM Bagchi, etc.). They dictate the days on which festivals are to be held. Sometimes, they lay down different dates for particular festivals. For the Durga Puja in 2005, two different sets of dates came through. Some community pujas followed the Gupta Press Panjika, because of its popularity. With deference to convention, it confirmed Pandit Nitai Chakraborty, president of Vaidik Pandit O Purohit Mahamilan Kendra. Belur Math adhered to Vishuddha Siddhanta Panjika. Swami Vijnanananda (who became Math president in 1937–38), an astrologer, decided that Ramakrishna Mission would follow this almanac as it was more scientific.

The difference occurs because the two schools follow different calendars of luni-solar movement on which tithis are based. While Gupta Press Panjika follows 16th century Raghunandan's work Ashtabingshatitatwa based on the 1,500-year-old astronomical treatise, Suryasiddhanta. Bisuddhasiddhanta Panjika is based on an 1890 amendment of the planetary positions given in Suryasiddhanta.

=== Scientific reform ===
The earliest Indian almanacs date back to around 1000 BCE. It did analyse time but the calculations were not always very accurate. Suryasiddhanta, produced in that era, was the forerunner of all later day panjikas.

During British rule, Biswambhar again began the work of publishing the panjika, in handwritten book form. The printed version came in 1869. Bisuddhasiddhanta Panjika was first published in 1890. Gupta Press follows Suryasiddhanta with the original format while the version with "corrected" scripture is called Visuddhasiddhanta.

The Bisuddhasiddhanta Panjika came into being because an astronomer Madhab Chandra Chattopadhyay, on studying the panjikas then in vogue found differences in the actual and astrological position of the planets and stars. He revised the panjika as per scientific readings. There were other people in different parts of India who also supported the approach for scientific revision of the panjika. It included such people as Pathani Samanta in Odisha and Bal Gangadhar Tilak in Pune.

In 1952, a major revision of the panjika was undertaken under the aegis of the Indian government.

=== The transformation ===
Gupta Press, one of the Bengali panjikas, has come out in 2007 with a CD-version packed with interactive features like 'know your day', 'daily horoscope' and 'koshthi bichar' (horoscope). Transformation has been staple food for the panjika. With the passage of time it has added information, like tourist attractions, pilgrim destinations, telephone codes and general information that common people seek, to make it more attractive. The format has also been made more flexible to cater to the needs of varied groups. The variants like 'directory panjika' (magnum opus) 'full panjika' (thinner version) and 'half panjika' (abridged version) and 'pocket panjika' have different price tags. The pocket panjika is a hawkers' delight on local trains.

Madan Gupter Full Panjika, which came out in the 1930s, has not changed much externally. The cover is still the same, on thick pink paper, but the inside is very different. The pages have changed from coarse newsprint to smooth white paper, the letter press has made way for offset printing, wooden blocks have been replaced by sharp photographs. The biggest difference is in the ad-editorial ratio. Previously the ads formed the bulk of the printed matter – and were pure delight. "When there was no TV and not so many newspapers, the panjika was the place to advertise for many products. Many people bought panjikas for the ads," says the owner Mahendra Kumar Gupta, "They would offer solutions to many 'incurable' diseases." The 1938 edition started off with a full-page ad on an "Electric Solution", which promised to revive dead men. Now they publish Durga Puja timings in London, Washington and New York, based on the sunset and sunrise there.

According to Arijit Roychowdhury, managing director of Gupta Press, panjika sales plunged after partition of India, as the market was lost in the eastern part of the former state. However, with innovative transformation of format and content, sales have been picking up and the overall annual market in 2007 is 2 million copies. The figure includes sales in the US and the UK.

Panjikas have found their way into modern day shopping malls also. A senior official of the RPG group, Mani Shankar Mukherjee, himself a reputed author, said, "Our Spencer's store in Gurgaon has sold a record number of panjikas." Bengali panjikas follow the Bengali calendar and are normally out in the month of Choitro, so that people can buy it well before Pohela Baishakh.

== Odia panji ==
Madala Panji (Odia: ମାଦଳ ପାଞ୍ଜି) is a chronicle of the Jagannath Temple, Puri in Odisha. It describes the historical events of Odisha related to Jagannath and the Jagannath Temple.^{[1]} The Madala Panji dates from the 12th century. The Madala Panji was traditionally written on a year-to-year basis. On Vijayadashami Day, the Karanas (official history writers of Puri, a caste of Odisha, involved in keeping the chronicle. The tradition of keeping this chronicle began with Odia king Anantavarman Chodaganga Dev (1078–1150). Madala Panji is the first panjika in Indian regional language, starting from the 12th century. It is the main source and evidence of Odisha history.

The modern Odia calendar begins with the scientific reforms initiated by the astronomer Pathani Samanta. His findings which included astronomical observations with the help of traditional instruments were recorded in his treatise Siddhanta Darpana written on palm-leaf manuscript in 1869 and eventually published in 1899 by Radharaman Pustaklaya Panjika, which still continues to print the Panjika. These observations were instrumental in the preparation of almanacs in Odisha especially by the astrologers of the Jagannath temple at Puri.

The other notable prominent panjis published in Odia include Radharaman Pustakalaya Khadiratna Panjika, Radharaman Pustakalaya Biraja Panjika, Radharaman Pustakalaya, Samanta Panjika, Radharaman Panji, Bhagyadeepa Panji, Bhagyajyoti Panji, Bhagyachakra Panji.
