= Pagaruyung III inscription =

- Kapalo Bukit Gombak I inscription
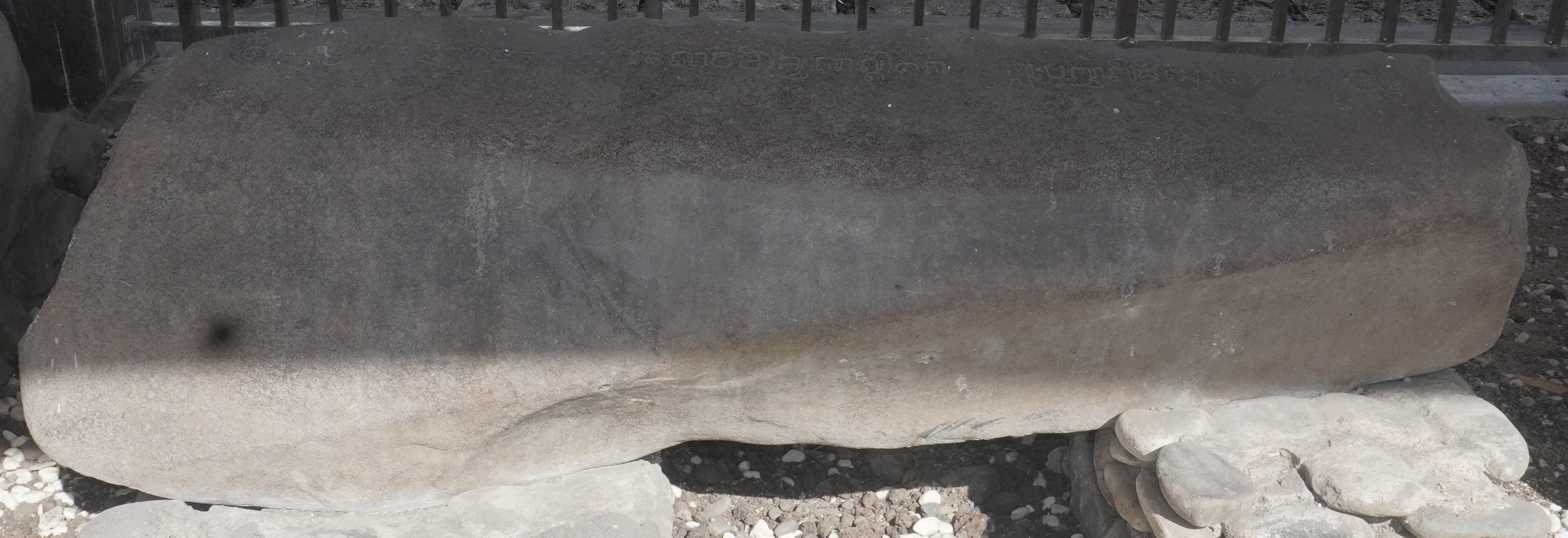
- Type: Stone inscription
- Material: Andesite
- Size: Height 190 cm Width 66 cm Thickness 15 cm
- Writing: Post-Pallava script
- Period/culture: During the reign of Adityawarman
- Place: Kapalo Bukit Gombak, Bukit Gombak, Tanah Datar Regency, West Sumatra
- Present location: Adityawarman Inscription Complex
- Coordinates: 0.4597310°S 100.6077240°E
- Language: Sanskrit
- Culture: Budaya Pagaruyung

Location
- Pagaruyung III inscription (Sumatra) Paguruyung III location

Pagaruyung III inscription, also referred to as Kapalo Bukit Gombak I inscription, is a stone inscription from the reign of King Adityawarman. The inscription is written in Sanskrit using the Post-Pallava script in the form of śloka with the anustubh metre. It was discovered at Kapalo Bukit Gombak, Lima Kaum District, Tanah Datar Regency, West Sumatra, Indonesia. It is currently preserved in the Adityawarman Inscription Complex located not far from Batusangkar City.

The inscription measures 190 cm in height, 66 cm in width, and 15 cm in thickness, carved on an andesite stone. Its content consists of a single line of chronogram reading dvare rasa bhuje rupe, which corresponds to the year 1269 Śaka, corresponding to 1347 CE. Pagaruyung III inscription and Saruaso I inscription were once thought to form part of the "Batu Beragung inscription", previously documented. However, Dr. Krom’s research concluded that this inscription never existed and that they are in fact two separate inscriptions.

Pagaruyung III inscription constitutes evidence of the activities of a Hindu-Buddhist kingdom during the era of Adityawarman, and holds significant value as cultural heritage and historical education for both the local community and the wider public. This inscription has been designated as a National Cultural Heritage Site through the decree of the Minister of Education and Culture number 77/M/2019, and is registered under inventory number 26/BCB-TB/SMB.

== Background ==
Archaeologist Dr. Nicolaas Johannes Krom was commissioned by the Colonial Government of the Dutch East Indies through Government Regulation No. 12 dated 23 March 1912 to conduct research on various artifacts and inscriptions around Fort Van der Capellen, in the West Coast of Sumatra. He recorded the existence of this inscription in the Oudheidkundig Verslag in 1912 under the name Kapalo Bukit Gombak I, and also noted that the inscription was referred to as Pagaruyung III. This designation was due to the fact that the inscription was originally discovered in Kapalo Bukit Gombak, Baringin Village, Lima Kaum District, Tanah Datar Regency, West Sumatra.

The inscription was later relocated from its original site to the Adityawarman Inscription Complex in Gudam, Pagaruyung Village, Tanjung Emas District, Tanah Datar Regency, together with several other inscriptions. The original site of the inscription is approximately 2 kilometers north of its current placement in Gudam.

The inscription has been administratively registered since 1977, and in 2019 was included in the register of cultural heritage objects in Tanah Datar Regency, by decree of the Minister of Education and Culture number 77/M/2019. This inscription, along with others in the Adityawarman Inscription Complex, is entered in the Inventory of the Cultural Heritage Preservation Office under inventory number 26/BCB-TB/SMB, and has been designated as National Cultural Heritage.

== Description ==
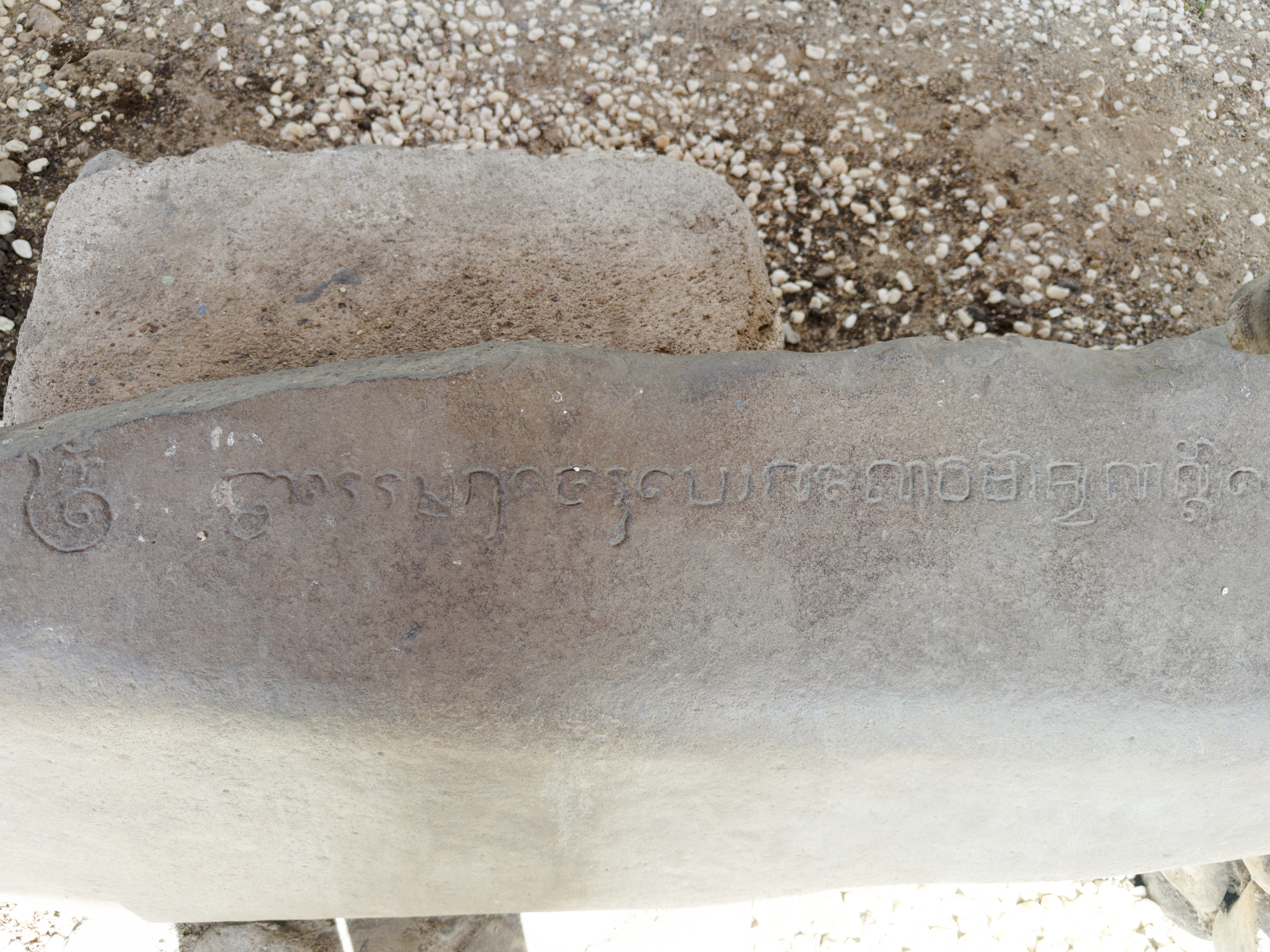
Close view of the Pagaruyung III inscription. On the far left edge there is a carved ornament of a tendril bud.

=== Physical ===
The Pagaruyung III inscription is carved on a brownish-grey andesite stone, elongated in a non-artificial form. The dimensions of the stone are 1.9 meters in length, 66 centimeters in width, and 15 centimeters in thickness. The writing on this inscription is engraved on the protruding side of the elongated stone surface. It appears that the stone was not shaped beforehand during the writing process, as its form resembles a menhir.

There is only a single line of writing on this inscription. On the upper left side, there is a decorative motif in the shape of a tendril bud.

=== Transliteration ===
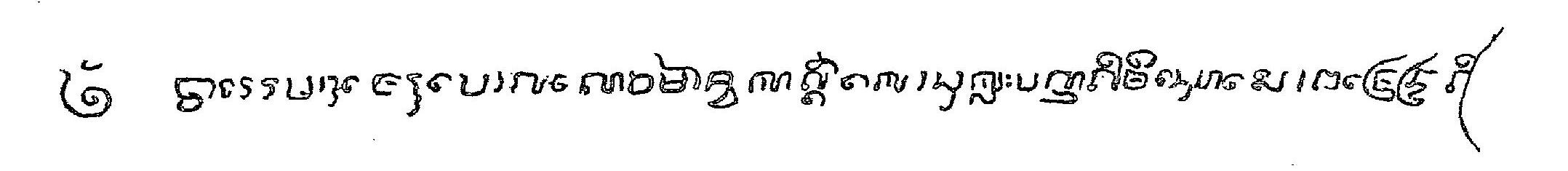
Facsimile of the writing on the Pagaruyung III inscription

The inscription is written in Sanskrit using the Post-Pallava script in the form of śloka with the anustubh metre. The following is the transliteration of the inscription according to the reading of Dr. N.J. Krom.

dvāreraṣabhūjerūpe | gatauvarṣāçcakārttike | suklaḥ pañcatithissome | bajrendra

or according to Hardjowardojo as follows:

Dvare rasa bhuje rupe
gato varsacça Kartike
suklah pancatithis Some
bajrendra

=== Translation ===
The following is the translation of the inscription according to Hardjowardojo:

In the year 1269, which has passed,
in the month of Kartika, during the bright fortnight,
on the fifth day, Monday, vajra Yoga,
Indra Karana Bava.

or according to Istiawan as follows:

In the year 1269 which has passed, in the month of Kartika during the bright fortnight, on the 5th day, Monday, in the Bajra and Indra yoga.

== Content of the inscription ==
=== Dating ===
The Pagaruyung III inscription contains only the date of its writing, namely Soma day, the 5th of Suklapaksa in the month of Kartika, year 1269 Saka, which corresponds to 8 October 1347 CE. The year number is obtained by reading the candra sengkala (chronogram) dware rasa bhuje rupe—meaning gate, intent, arm, form. The word dware has the value nine, rasa has the value six, bhuje has the value two, and rupe has the value one. When read backwards, it becomes 1269 Saka or 1347 CE. Considering this year, it is highly likely that the inscription was issued during the reign of King Adityawarman.

=== Interpretation ===
Istiawan argues that the Pagaruyung III inscription should have contained additional information regarding a certain event, but the event cannot be known because part of the inscription is missing. The missing event was possibly related to a teaching about religion and life, interpreted from the sentence arranged in the chronogram.

The word rasa can mean conscience, bhuje or arm means achievement or a tool to achieve something, rupa or face means front, and dwara or gate means that which appears in front. Istiawan interprets the meaning of the sentence from the series of words as that humans in their lives have rasa as the driving force of their motivation in acting, which is carried out with their hands to achieve a goal or as an entrance to always be the best.

The content of the inscription, which mentions dating without referring to a specific event, raises the suspicion that this inscription may be related to the context of a temple or other religious building. The physical form of the inscription, which resembles a dorpal (door threshold), supports the suspicion that the dating may have been a commemoration of the establishment of a building or place. In addition, the use of the word dware (gate) may indicate its function as a gate or part of a building. Thus, this inscription was most likely erected to commemorate the establishment of a building or sacred religious site, the existence of which remains unknown to this day.

=== Significance ===
Although it contains only the year, the Pagaruyung III inscription is one of the pieces of evidence showing the activities of Adityawarman in the Pagaruyung region. Culturally, the inscription functions as an educational tool for the people of Pagaruyung as well as the general public to learn about the history of that period.

== The "Batu Beragung inscription" case ==
Identification of the Batu Beragung inscription according to Dr. Friedrich. However, Dr. Krom found that this was a combination of the Pagaruyung III inscription and the Saruaso I inscription.

An inscription named the "Batu Beragung inscription" was documented by Vitzthum von Eckstaed in Batu Baraguang Village, then translated by Dr. R. Friederich and published in Verhandelingen van het Bataviaasch Genootschap van Kunsten en Wetenschappen (Journal of the Batavian Society of Arts and Sciences) volume 26 in 1857. This inscription was reported to contain five lines of text, which were thought to be a continuation of the Pagaruyung III inscription.

Dr. N.J. Krom, as Chairman of the Archaeological Research Commission in Java and Madura, attempted to search for the physical existence of this inscription among various artifacts and other inscriptions around Fort Van der Capellen during the last week of April 1912 until early May 1912. In his research process, he did not find a complete inscription as documented, but instead found two other inscriptions that had identical similarities with parts of it.

The Pagaruyung III inscription has identical similarities with the first line, while the Saruaso I inscription has identical similarities with the following four lines. The similarities found even extended to the arrangement of the text, the tendril bud ornament, and the eroded part of the stone. Based on these similarities, Krom finally concluded that the two other inscriptions referred to the same object, and thus he determined that the Batu Beragung inscription never truly existed, but was merely a copying error.

== See also ==
- Melayu Kingdom
- Pagaruyung kingdom
