= Ganitagannadi =

1604 commentary in Kannada

Gaṇitagannaḍi (Mirror of Mathematics) is a commentary in Kannada on Viddṇācārya's Vārșikatantra composed by Śaṅkaranārāyaṇa Joisāru in 1604. Viddṇācārya's Vārșikatantra is a karaṇa text written before 1370 CE.

The book, written in Nandinagari script, is a karaṇa text, that is, a book which explain the various computations in astronomy especially with regard to those related to the preparation of Panchangam-s (calendar). Even though manuscripts of Kannada commentaries of several Sanskrit texts on astronomy like Sūryasiddhānta have been identified, Gaṇitagannaḍi is the first such commentary ever to be translated into English, printed and published. Gaṇitagannaḍi was translated into English by B. S. Shylaja, a scientist associated with Jawaharlal Nehru Planetarium, Bengaluru and Seetharama Javagal and was published in 2021. It was Seetharama Javagal who brought to light the palm leaf manuscript of Gaṇitagannaḍi in his grandfather's collection.

The most important specialty of the book from an astronomical point of view is that, "in the third chapter (Chāyāddhāya). all the computations are based on a single parameter, namely the shadow length. Other quantities are based on Dyu-nishardha-Karna, to be obtained daily. This includes vishuvat-karna and vishuvatchaya. This clearly demonstrates the importance of actual observations. These traditional astronomers always advocated drig-ganita-aikya (that is, the concordance between observation and computation)."

== Outline of the book ==
The first chapter of the book deals with the procedure for getting kalidina, starting from the kalivarsa count, and the method for getting the mean positions for planets. The second chapter provides the method for deriving the true positions of all planets, perigees and the nodes. The third chapter describes the procedures of tripraśnādhikāra in Sūryasiddhānta. The fourth chapter is devoted to eclipses. The fifth chapter describes a graphical method for obtaining the timings, magnitudes, and points of ingress. The next three chapters are very brief. The last chapter describes the determination of the elevation of the cusps of the crescent moon.
