= Vishuddha Siddhanta Panjika =

Hindu astrological almanac

Vishuddha Siddhanta Panjika (Bengali: বিশুদ্ধ সিদ্ধান্ত পঞ্জিকা) is a Hindu panjika (almanac) that was first published in 1890 CE (1297 BS). Mathematician Madhab Chandra Chattopadhyay of Bengal in undivided India was its first editor, and it has been published continuously since its inception.

This panjika is fully consistent with the national Panchang calculation method published by the Government of India. Currently, its Tithi and Nakshatra are calculated scientifically using computers, a method recognized by renowned scientists like Meghnad Saha and N. C. Lahiri. Due to its accurate calculations, prominent religious institutions like Belur Math and Tarakeswar Math follow this panjika.
