= Telugu years =

Calendar year in Telugu culture

In India, the Telugu year is the calendar year of the Telugu speaking people of Andhra Pradesh, Telangana, and the enclave Yanam.

Each Yuga (era) has a cycle of 60 years. Each year of Ugadi year has a specific name in Panchangam (astronomical calendar) based on astrological influences and the name of the year; this denotes the overall character of that year. The calendar includes 60 year names. Every 60 years, one name cycle completes, repeat in the next omnibus cycle. For example, the Telugu name for 1954 is "Jaya", and it first repeated in 2014. Ugadi is the Telugu new year festival in spring (usually March or April). These years always change on Ugadi.

In Telugu mythology, the names of the years are those of Maharshi Narada's children's names. To teach a lesson to Naradha, Lord Vishnu presented an illusion to Naradha of a lady, who eventually gave birth to 60 children – all of whom were to die in a war. After this denouement, and Narada having learned his lesson, Vishnu offered boon to Naradha that his children's names would be the names of the cyclic, and that their specific characteristics would carry over to those that years. E.g., 2024 is a Krodhi year.

== Years ==
The sixty Ugadi year names are as follows:

1. (1867, 1927, 1987, 2047) Prabhava ప్రభవ (యజ్ఞములు అధికంగా జరుగుతాయి)
2. (1868, 1928, 1988, 2048) Vibhava విభవ (సుఖంగా జీవిస్తారు)
3. (1869, 1929, 1989, 2049) Śukla శుక్ల (సమృద్దిగా పంటలు పండుతాయి)
4. (1870, 1930, 1990, 2050) Pramōdyuta ప్రమోద్యూత (అందరికి ఆనందాన్ని ఇస్తుంది)
5. (1871, 1931, 1991, 2051) Prajōtpatti ప్రజోత్పత్తి (అన్నింటిలోను అభివృద్ధి ఉంటుంది)
6. (1872, 1932, 1992, 2052) Āṅgīrasa ఆంగీరస (భోగాలు కలుగుతాయి)
7. (1873, 1933, 1993, 2053) Śrīmukha శ్రీముఖ (వనరులు సమృద్దిగా ఉంటాయి)
8. (1874, 1934, 1994, 2054) Bhava భవ (ఉన్నత భావాలు కలిగి ఉంటారు)
9. (1875, 1935, 1995, 2055) Yuva యువ (వర్షాలు కురిపించి పంటలు సమృద్ధిగా చేతికి అందుతాయి)
10. (1876, 1936, 1996, 2056) Dhāta ధాత (అనారోగ్య బాధలు తగ్గుతాయి)
11. (1877, 1937, 1997, 2057) Īśvara ఈశ్వర (క్షేమం, ఆరోగ్యాన్ని సూచిస్తుంది)
12. (1878, 1938, 1998, 2058) Bahudhānya బహుధాన్య (దేశం సుభిక్షంగా, సంతోషంగా ఉండాలని సూచిస్తుంది)
13. (1879, 1939, 1999, 2059) Pramādhi ప్రమాధి (వర్షాలు మధ్యస్థంగా ఉంటాయి‌)
14. (1880, 1940, 2000, 2060) Vikrama విక్రమ (పంటలు బాగా పండి రైతన్నలు సంతోషిస్తారు, విజయాలు సాధిస్తారు)
15. (1881, 1941, 2001, 2061) Vr̥ṣa వృష (వర్షాలు సమృద్ధిగా కురుస్తాయి)
16. (1882, 1942, 2002, 2062) Citrabhānu చిత్రభాను (అద్భుతమైన ఫలితాలు పొందుతారు)
17. (1883, 1943, 2003, 2063) Svabhānu స్వభాను (క్షేమము, ఆరోగ్యం)
18. (1884, 1944, 2004, 2064) Tāraṇa తారణ (మేఘాలు సరైన సమయంలో వర్షించి సమృద్ధిగా వర్షాలు కురుస్తాయి)
19. (1885, 1945, 2005, 2065) Pārthiva పార్థివ (ఐశ్వర్యం, సంపద పెరుగుతాయి)
20. (1886, 1946, 2006, 2066) Vyaya వ్యయ (అతివృష్టి, అనవసర ఖర్చులు)
21. (1887, 1947, 2007, 2067) Sarvajittu సర్వజిత్తు (సంతోషకరంగా చాలా వర్షాలు కురుస్తాయి)
22. (1888, 1948, 2008, 2068) Sarvadhāri సర్వధారి (సుభిక్షంగా ఉంటారు)
23. (1889, 1949, 2009, 2069) Virōdhi విరోధి (వర్షాలు లేకుండా ఇబ్బందులు పడే సమయం)
24. (1890, 1950, 2010, 2070) Vikr̥ti వికృతి (ఈ సమయం భయంకరంగా ఉంటుంది)
25. (1891, 1951, 2011, 2071) Khara ఖర (పరిస్థితులు సాధారణంగా ఉంటాయి)
26. (1892, 1952, 2012, 2072) Nandana ‌నందన (ప్రజలకు ఆనందం కలుగుతుంది)
27. (1893, 1953, 2013, 2073) Vijaya విజయ (శత్రువులను జయిస్తారు)
28. (1894, 1954, 2014, 2074) Jaya జయ (లాభాలు, విజయం సాధిస్తారు)
29. (1895, 1955, 2015, 2075) Manmadha మన్మధ (జ్వరాది బాధలు తొలగిపోతాయి)
30. (1896, 1956, 2016, 2076) Durmukhi దుర్ముఖి (ఇబ్బందులు ఉన్న క్షేమంగానే ఉంటారు)
31. (1897, 1957, 2017, 2077) Hēvaḷambi హేవళంబి (ప్రజలు సంతోషంగా ఉంటారు)
32. (1898, 1958, 2018, 2078) Viḷambi విళంబి (సుభిక్షంగా ఉంటారు)
33. (1899, 1959, 2019, 2079) Vikāri వికారి (అనారోగ్యాన్ని కలిగిస్తుంది, శత్రువులకు చాలా కోపం తీసుకొస్తుంది)
34. (1900, 1960, 2020, 2080) Śārvari శార్వరి (చీకటి)
35. (1901, 1961, 2021, 2081) Plava ప్లవ (ఒడ్డుకు చేర్చునది)
36. (1902, 1962, 2022, 2082) Śubhakr̥ttu శుభకృతు (శుభములు కలిగించేది)
37. (1903, 1963, 2023, 2083) Śōbhakr̥ttu శోభకృతు (లాభములు కలిగించేది)
38. (1904, 1964, 2024, 2084) Krōdhi క్రోధి (కోపం కలిగించేది)
39. (1905, 1965, 2025, 2085) Viśvāvasu విశ్వావసు (ధనం సమృద్ధిగా ఉంటుంది)
40. (1906, 1966, 2026, 2086) Parābhava పరాభవ (ప్రజల పరాభవాలకు గురవుతారు)
41. (1907, 1967, 2027, 2087) Plavaṅga ప్లవంగ (నీరు సమృద్ధిగా ఉంటుంది)
42. (1908, 1968, 2028, 2088) Kīlaka కీలక (పంటలు బాగా పండుతాయి)
43. (1909, 1969, 2029, 2089) Saumya సౌమ్య (శుభ ఫలితాలు అధికం)
44. (1910, 1970, 2030, 2090) Sādhāraṇa సాధారణ (సాధారణ పరిస్థితులు ఉంటాయి)
45. (1911, 1971, 2031, 2091) Virōdhikr̥ttu విరోధికృతు (ప్రజల్లో విరోధం ఏర్పడుతుంది)
46. (1912, 1972, 2032, 2092) Paridhāvi పరిధావి (ప్రజల్లో భయం ఎక్కువగా ఉంటుంది)
47. (1913, 1973, 2033, 2093) Pramādīca ప్రమాదీచ (ప్రమాదాలు ఎక్కువ)
48. (1914, 1974, 2034, 2094) Ānanda ఆనంద (ఆనందంగా ఉంటారు)
49. (1915, 1975, 2035, 2095) Rākṣasa రాక్షస (కఠిన హృదయం కలిగి ఉంటారు)
50. (1916, 1976, 2036, 2096) Nala నల (పంటలు బాగా పండుతాయి)
51. (1917, 1977, 2037, 2097) Piṅgaḷa పింగళ (సామాన్య ఫలితాలు కలుగుతాయి)
52. (1918, 1978, 2038, 2098) Kāḷayukti కాళయుక్తి (కాలానికి అనుకూలమైన ఫలితాలు లభిస్తాయి)
53. (1919, 1979, 2039, 2099) Siddhārthi సిద్ధార్ది (కార్య సిద్ధి)
54. (1920, 1980, 2040, 2100) Raudri రౌద్రి (ప్రజలకు చిన్నపాటి బాధలు ఉంటాయి)
55. (1921, 1981, 2041, 2101) Durmati దుర్మతి (వర్షాలు సామాన్యంగా ఉంటాయి)
56. (1922, 1982, 2042, 2102) Dundubhi దుందుభి (క్షేమం, ధ్యానం)
57. (1923, 1983, 2043, 2103) Rudhirōdgāri రుధిరోద్గారి (ప్రమాదాలు ఎక్కువ)
58. (1924, 1984, 2044, 2104) Raktākṣi రక్తాక్షి (అశుభాలు కలుగుతాయి)
59. (1925, 1985, 2045, 2105) Krōdhana క్రోధన (విజయాలు సిద్ధిస్తాయి)
60. (1926, 1986, 2046, 2106) Akṣaya అక్షయ (తరగని సంపద)

== Significance ==
In ancient days Yogis (saints) interact directly with God, according to that, they have given information related to our Indian Kalachakra (time-cycle) in relation to Lord Brahma. Below is the Indian Kalachakra (time-cycle):

60 years = Shashthipurti

432,000 years = Kali Yuga

864,000 years = Dvapara Yuga

1,296,000 years = Treta Yuga

1,728,000 years = Satya Yuga

4,320,000 years = Chatur Yuga (Total 4 Yuga)

71 Chatur Yuga = Manvantara

1,000 Chatur Yuga = Kalpa a.k.a. Brahma day (= 14 Manvantara + 15 Manvantara-sandhya)

Kalpa + Pralaya = Brahma Day (day + night)

30 Brahma Days = Brahma month

12 Brahma months = Brahma year

100 Brahma years = Brahma lifespan a.k.a. Maha-kalpa of 311.04 trillion years (followed by Maha-pralaya of equal length)
