= Javanese calendar =

Calendar used in Java, Indonesia

The Javanese calendar (Javanese: ꦥꦤꦁꦒꦭ꧀ꦭꦤ꧀ꦗꦮ, romanized: Pananggalan Jawa) is the calendar of the Javanese people, especially in the former Mataram region where it is originated. It is used concurrently with two other calendars, the Gregorian calendar and the Islamic calendar. The Gregorian calendar is the official calendar of the Republic of Indonesia and civil society, while the Islamic calendar is used by Muslims and the Indonesian government for religious worship and deciding relevant Islamic holidays.

The Javanese calendar is used by the main ethnicities of Java island—that is, the Javanese, Madurese, and Sundanese people—primarily as a cultural icon and identifier, and as a maintained tradition of antiquity. The Javanese calendar is used for cultural and spiritual purposes.

The current system of the Javanese calendar was inaugurated by Sultan Agung of Mataram in the Gregorian year 1633 CE. Prior to this, the Javanese had used the Śaka calendar, which has its epoch in 78 CE and uses the lunisolar cycle for calculating time. Sultan Agung's calendar retained the Saka calendar year system of counting, but differs by using the same lunar year measurement system as the Islamic calendar, rather than the solar year. Occasionally, the Javanese calendar is referred to by its Latin name Anno Javanico or AJ (Javanese Year).

== Calendar cycles ==
The Javanese calendar contains multiple, overlapping (but separate) measurements of times, called "cycles". These include:

- the native five-day week, called Pasaran
- the common Gregorian and Islamic seven-day week
- the Solar month, called Mangsa
- the Lunar month, called Wulan
- the lunar year, or Tahun
- the octennial (8 year) cycles, or Windu
- the 120-year cycle of 15 Windu, called Kurup

Year AD/CE	Year AJ	Javanese month
2011	1944	6
2012	1945	6
2013	1946	6
2014	1947	7
2015	1948	7
2016	1949	8
2017	1950	8
2018	1951	8
2019	1952	9
2020	1953	9

Year AD/CE	Year AJ	Javanese month
2021	1954	9
2022	1955	10
2023	1956	10
2024	1957	11
2025	1958	11
2026	1959	11
2027	1960	12
2028	1961	12
2029	1962	12
2030	1963	1

=== Current correlations ===
The Javanese calendar year of 1941 occurred entirely within the civil calendar year of 2008. Such years occur once every 33 or 34 Javanese years (32 or 33 civil years). More are listed here:

Javanese year within civil year
Javanese	Civil	Difference
1575	1653	78
1608	1685	77
1649	1718	76
1673	1751	75
1706	1783	74
1740	1816	73
1773	1848	72
1807	1882	71
1841	1914	70
1877	1946	69
1908	1979	68
1944	2011	67
1977	2043	66
2011	2076	65
2043	2108	64
2076	2140	63

A Javanese year will be entirely within a Gregorian year of the same number in the year 4195, after which year the number of the Javanese year will always be greater than the number of the concurrent civil year.

== Division of time ==
Days in the Javanese calendar, like the Islamic calendar, begin at sunset. Traditionally, Javanese people do not divide the day and night into hours, but rather into phases. The division of a day and night are:

Division of time
Start	End	Javanese name	Meaning
6 am	8 am	ésuk ꦲꦺꦱꦸꦏ꧀	morning
8 am	12 pm	tengangi ꦠꦼꦁꦲꦔꦶ	midday
12 pm	1 pm	bedug ꦧꦼꦢꦸꦒ꧀	time for bedug prayer
1 pm	3 pm	lingsir kulon ꦭꦶꦁꦱꦶꦂꦏꦸꦭꦺꦴꦤ꧀	(sun) moving west
3 pm	6 pm	asar ꦲꦱꦂ	time for asar prayer
6 pm	8 pm	soré ꦱꦺꦴꦫꦺ	evening
8 pm	11 pm	sirap ꦱꦶꦫꦥ꧀	sleepy time
11 pm	1 am	tengah wengi ꦠꦼꦔꦃꦮꦼꦔꦶ	midnight
1 am	3 am	lingsir wengi ꦭꦶꦁꦱꦶꦂꦮꦼꦔꦶ	late night
3 am	6 am	bangun ꦧꦔꦸꦤ꧀	awakening

== Cycles of days ==
=== Five-day week (Pasaran) ===
The native Javanese system groups days into a five-day week called Pasaran, unlike most calendars that uses a seven-day week. The name, pasaran, is derived from the root word pasar ("market"). Historically, but also still today, Javanese villagers gather communally at local markets to socially meet, engage in commerce, and buy and sell farm produce, cooked foods, home industry crafted items and so on. John Crawfurd (1820) suggested that the length of the weekly cycle is related to the number of fingers on the hand, and that itinerant merchants would rotate their visits to different villages according to a five-day "roster".

The days of the cycle each have two names, as the Javanese language has distinct vocabulary associated with two different registers of politeness: ngoko (informal) and krama (formal). The krama names for the days, second in the list, are much less common.

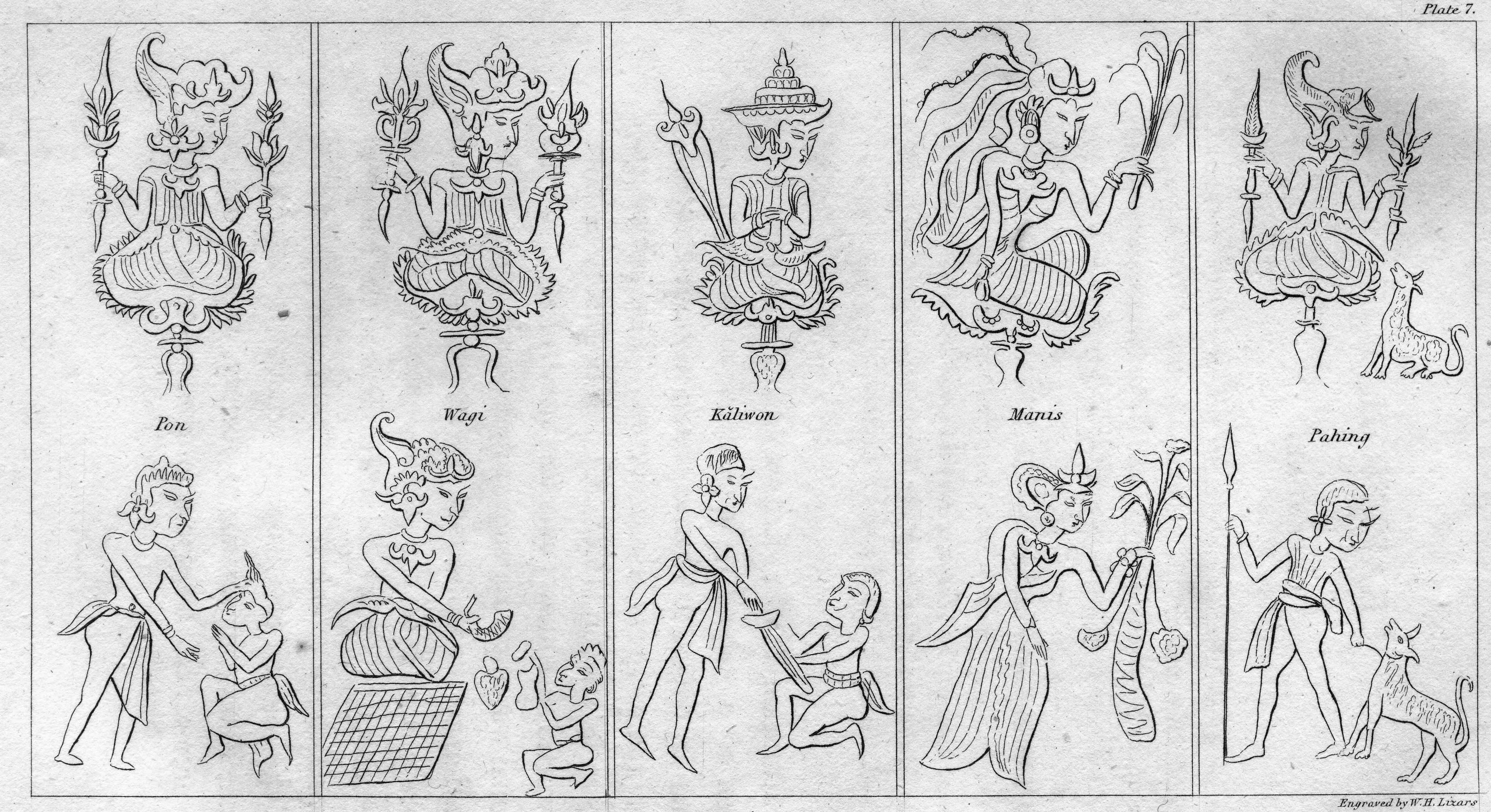
Signs of the Pasaran cycle

- ꦊꦒꦶ (Legi) – ꦩꦤꦶꦱ꧀ (Manis)
- ꦥꦲꦶꦁ (Pahing) – ꦥꦲꦶꦠ꧀ (Pait)
- ꦥꦺꦴꦤ꧀ (Pon) – ꦥꦼꦛꦏ꧀ (Pethak)
- ꦮꦒꦺ (Wagé) – ꦕꦼꦩꦺꦁ (Cemèng)
- ꦏ꧀ꦭꦶꦮꦺꦴꦤ꧀ (Kliwon) – ꦲꦱꦶꦃ (Asih)

The origin of the names is unclear, and their etymology remains obscure. Possibly, the names may be derived from indigenous gods, like the European and Asian names for days of the week. An ancient Javanese manuscript illustrates the week with five human figures (shown at right below the day names): a man seizing a suppliant by the hair, a woman holding a horn to receive an offering, a man pointing a drawn sword at another, a woman holding agricultural produce, and a man holding a spear leading a bull.

Additionally, Javanese consider these days' names to have a mystical relation to colors and cardinal direction:

- Legi : white and East
- Pahing : red and South
- Pon : yellow and West
- Wagé : black and North
- Kliwon : blurred colors/focus and 'center'.

Most Markets no longer operate under this traditional Pasaran cycle, instead pragmatically remaining open every day of the Gregorian week. However many markets in Java still retain traditional names that indicated that once the markets only operated on certain Pasaran days, such as Pasar Legi, or Pasar Kliwon. Some markets in small or medium size locations will be much busier on the Pasaran day than on the other days. On the market's name day itinerant sellers appear selling such things as livestock, plants and other products that are either less frequently purchased or are more expensive. This allows a smaller number of these merchants to service a much larger area much as in bygone days.

Javanese astrological belief dictates that an individual's characteristics and destiny are attributable to the combination of the Pasaran day and the "common" weekday of the Islamic calendar on that person's birthday. Javanese people find great interest in the astrological interpretations of this combination, called the Wetonan cycle.

=== Seven-day week ===
The seven-day-long week cycle (dina pitu, "seven days") is derived from the Islamic calendar, adopted following the spread of Islam throughout the Indonesian archipelago. The names of the days of the week in Javanese are derived from their Arabic counterparts, namely:

Days of Seven-day Week
Javanese	Arabic	English
Senin (ꦱꦼꦤꦶꦤ꧀)	yaum al-ithnayn ( يوم الاثنين )	Monday
Selasa (ꦱꦼꦭꦱ)	yaum ath-thalatha' ( يوم الثلاثاء )	Tuesday
Rebo (ꦉꦧꦺꦴ)	yaum al-arba`a' ( يوم الأربعاء )	Wednesday
Kemis (ꦏꦼꦩꦶꦱ꧀)	yaum al-khamis ( يوم الخميس )	Thursday
Jemuwah (ꦗꦼꦩꦸꦮꦃ)	yaum al-jum`a ( يوم الجمعة )	Friday
Setu (ꦱꦼꦠꦸ)	yaum as-sabt ( يوم السبت )	Saturday
Minggu/Ahad (ꦩꦶꦁꦒꦸ/ꦲꦲꦢ꧀)	yaum al-ahad ( يوم الأحد )	Sunday

These two week systems occur concurrently; thus, a certain Friday may fall on a Kliwon day, and is consequently called Jumat Kliwon. This combination forms the Wetonan cycle.

=== Wetonan cycle ===
The Wetonan cycle superimposes the five-day Pasaran cycle with the seven-day week cycle. Each Wetonan cycle lasts for 35 (7x5) days. An example of Wetonan cycle:

The "Wetonan" Cycle for 2nd week of May (Mei) 2008:
English	Monday 5	Tuesday 6	Wednesday 7	Thursday 8	Friday 9	Saturday 10	Sunday 11
Javanese seven-day week	Senin 5	Selasa 6	Rebo 7	Kemis 8	Jumat 9	Setu 10	Minggu/ Ahad 11
Javanese Pasaran week	28 Pon	29 Wage	1 Kliwon	2 Legi	3 Pahing	4 Pon	5 Wage

From the example above, the Weton for Tuesday May 6, 2008 would be read as Selasa Wage.

The Wetonan cycle is especially important for divinatory systems, important celebrations, and rites of passage. Commemorations and events are held on days considered to be auspicious.

An especially prominent example, still widely taught in primary schools, is that the Weton for the Proclamation of Indonesian Independence on 17 August 1945 took place on Jumat Legi; this is also the Weton for the birth and death of Sultan Agung, one of the greatest kings of Java and the inventor of the modern Javanese calendar. Therefore, Jumat Legi is considered an important night for pilgrimage. There are also taboos that relate to the cycle; for example, the ritual dance bedhaya can only be performed on Kemis Kliwon.

The coincidence of the Pasaran day with the common day on the day of birth is considered by Javanese to indicate the personal characteristics of that person, similar to the Western Zodiac and planetary positioning in Western astrology.

=== Pawukon cycle ===
Pawukon is a 210-day cycle in Javanese calendar, related to Hindu tradition. Though most associated with Bali, it is still used in Java for special purposes. The calendar consists of concurrent weeks, and has a set of ten weeks, which have a duration of 1, 2, 3, 4, 5, 6, 7, 8, 9, and 10 days.

The first day of the year is considered the first day of all ten weeks. As 210 is not divisible by 4, 8, or 9, extra days must be added to the 4-, 8-, and 9-day weeks.

=== Dates numbering ===
For timekeeping, days are numbered within the lunar month (wulan) as is common in other calendar systems. The date indicates the change in the moon, and symbolizes the life of a human in the world. This process of revolving life is known as cakra manggilingan or heru cakra.

On the first day of the month, when the moon is small, it is compared to a newborn baby. The 14th day, called Purnama Sidhi (full moon), represents a married adult. The next day, called Purnama, occurs as the moon begins to wane. The 20th day, Panglong, symbolizes the point at which people begin to lose their memory. The 25th day, Sumurup, represents the point at which the adult requires care like when they were young. The 26th day, Manjing, represents the return of the human to his or her origin.

== Cycles of months ==
Because a Javanese lunar year is between 11 and 12 days shorter than a civil year, it begins 11–12 days earlier in the civil year following the civil year in which the previous Javanese year began. Once every 33 or 34 Javanese years, or once every 32 or 33 civil years, the beginning of a Javanese year (1 Sura) coincides with one of the first ten days of January. Subsequent New Years move backwards through the civil year back to the beginning of January again, passing through each civil month from December to January.

=== Mangsa ===
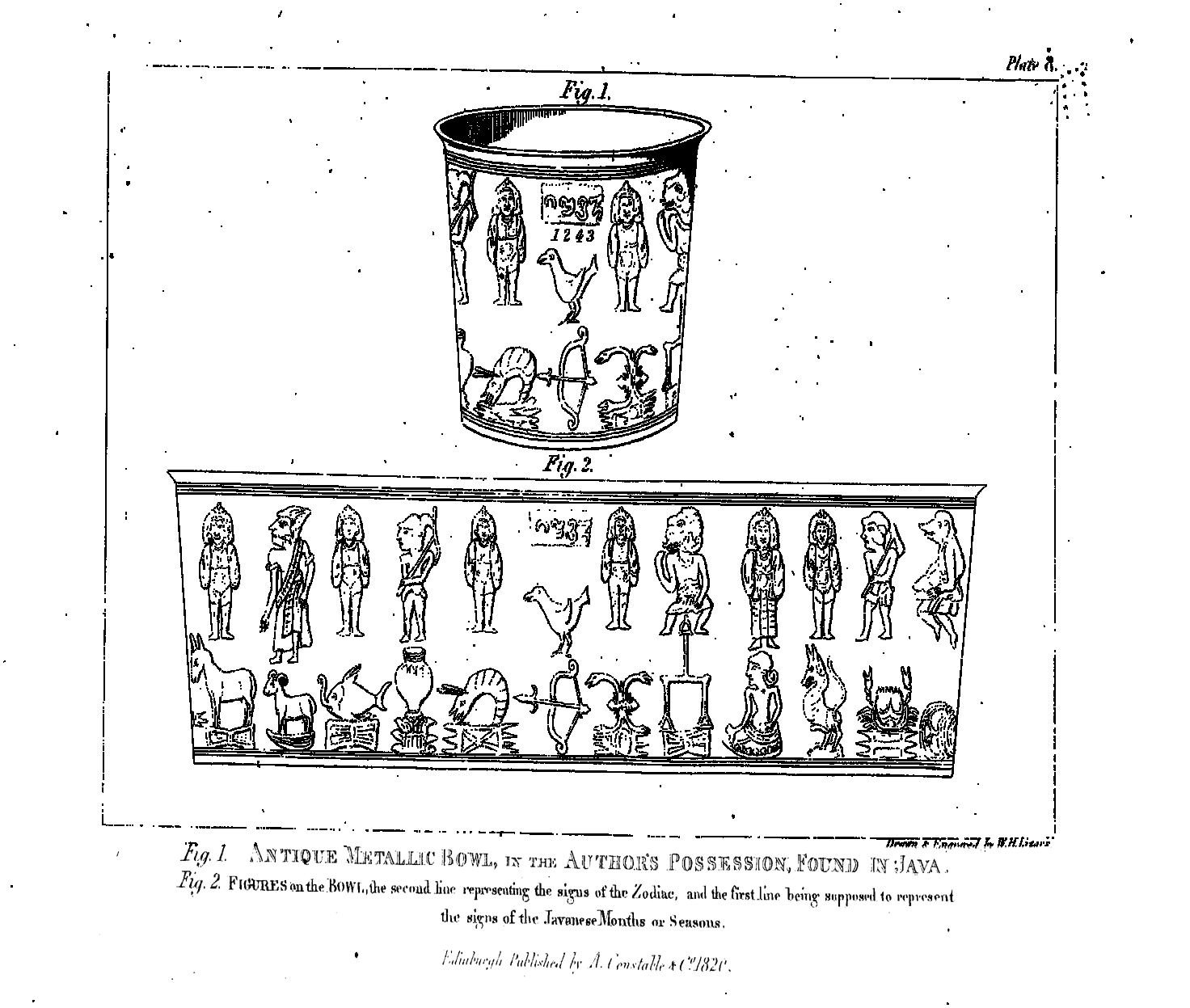
Signs of Solar months (mangsa) in Javanese Calendar (upper row) with sign of Hindu zodiacs (lower row).

The solar year is divided into twelve periods (mangsa) of unequal length. Its origin lies in agriculture practice in Java. The names of the first ten months are simply the ordinal numbers from 1 to 10 in Javanese language, although the names of the 11th and 12th months are unclear. The cycle begins near the June solstice, around the middle of the dry season in Java.

In the 19th century, the solar month system or pranata mangsa was much better known among Javanese than the civil or religious year. The cycle is clearly of Javanese origin, since the specific application to their climate does not match other territories in the Indonesian archipelago, as well as the usage of Javanese names for the months. Although the cycle matches the weather pattern well, it is still clearly somewhat arbitrary, as can be seen in the lengths of the months.

In astrology, the pranata mangsa is used to predict personality traits in a similar manner to sun signs in Western astrology. It is not widely used anymore for divination, but some practitioners use it as well as the other cycles in their divination.

The Solar months are :

Pranata mangsa
Starting day	Name	Length in days	Description
23 June	Mangsa Kaso ꦩꦁꦱꦏꦱꦺꦴ	41	The dry season; leaves are falling from the trees; the ground is withered and arid, bereft of water "like a jewel that has come free of its setting."
3 August	Mangsa Karo ꦩꦁꦱꦏꦫꦺꦴ	23	The dry season; parched earth lies in hard clumps; the mango and cotton trees begin to bloom.
26 August	Mangsa Katelu ꦩꦁꦱꦏꦠꦼꦭꦸ	24	The dry season; spice roots are harvested; the gadung tree begins to bear fruit.
19 September	Mangsa Kapat ꦩꦁꦱꦏꦥꦠ꧀	25	Rain begins to fall, as "tears well up in the soul", marking the end of the dry season; birds are singing and busily constructing nests. The Labuh Season is at hand.
14 October	Mangsa Kalima ꦩꦁꦱꦏꦭꦶꦩ	27	The rainy season, sometimes with fierce winds and flooding; mangoes are ripe; snakes are driven from their nests; "a fountain of gold falls across the earth".
11 November	Mangsa Kanem ꦩꦁꦱꦏꦤꦼꦩ꧀	43	The rainy season; lightning strikes and there are landslides; but it is also the season of many fruit.
23 December	Mangsa Kapitu ꦩꦁꦱꦏꦥꦶꦠꦸ	43	The rainy season is at its peak; birds are hard pressed to find food, and in many areas there is severe flooding.
4 February	Mangsa Kawolu ꦩꦁꦱꦏꦮꦺꦴꦭꦸ	26/27	The rainy season; rice fields are growing and the cat is looking for his mate; grubs and larvae abound.
2 March	Mangsa Kasanga ꦩꦁꦱꦏꦱꦔ	25	The rainy season; rice fields are turning yellow; "happy news is spreading"; water is stored within the earth, the wind blows in one direction, and many fruits are ripe.
27 March	Mangsa Kasadasa ꦩꦁꦱꦏꦱꦢꦱ	24	Rain yet falls, but is diminishing; the wind rustles and blows hard; the air is still chilly. The Mareng Season is at hand.
20 April	Mangsa Dèsta ꦩꦁꦱꦢꦺꦱ꧀ꦠ	23	The dry season has begun; farmers are harvesting the rice fields; birds tend their young with affection, as if they were "jewels of the heart".
13 May	Mangsa Saddha ꦩꦁꦱꦱꦢ꧀ꦝ	41	The dry season; water begins to recede, "vanishing from its many places".

=== Wulan ===
Each lunar year (taun) is divided into a series of twelve wulan/sasi or lunar months. Each consists of 29 or 30 days. This is adapted from the use of months in the Islamic calendar. The names of the month are given below in Javanese and Arabic which can be used interchangeably:

Javanese lunar months
Ngoko (informal)	Arabic names	Length of days
Sura ꦱꦸꦫ	Muharram ( المحرّم )	30
Sapar ꦱꦥꦂ	Safar ( صفر )	29
Mulud/Rabingulawal ꦩꦸꦭꦸꦢ꧀/ꦫꦧꦶꦔꦸꦭꦮꦭ꧀	Rabi I ( ربيع الأوّل )	30
Bakda Mulud/Rabingulakir ꦧꦏ꧀ꦢꦩꦸꦭꦸꦢ꧀/ꦫꦧꦶꦔꦸꦭꦏꦶꦂ	Rabi II ( ربيع الثاني / الآخر )	29
Jumadilawal ꦗꦸꦩꦢꦶꦭꦮꦭ꧀	Jumada I ( جمادى الأولى )	30
Jumadilakir ꦗꦸꦩꦢꦶꦭꦏꦶꦂ	Jumada II ( جمادى الثانية / الآخرة )	29
Rejeb ꦉꦗꦼꦧ꧀	Rajab ( رجب )	30
Ruwah/Arwah ꦫꦸꦮꦃ/ꦲꦂꦮꦃ	Sha'ban ( شعبان )	29
Pasa/Siyam ꦥꦱ/ꦱꦶꦪꦩ꧀	Ramadan ( رمضان )	30
Sawal ꦱꦮꦭ꧀	Shawwal ( شوّال )	29
Sela/Apit ꦱꦼꦭ/ꦲꦥꦶꦠ꧀	Dhu'l-Qa'da ( ذو القعدة )	30
Besar/Kaji ꦧꦼꦱꦂ/ꦏꦗꦶ	Dhu'l-Hijja ( ذو الحجّة )	29 or 30

Length of the last month may be 29 or 30 days, depending on whether the year is normal or a leap year (taun kabisat).

The cycle of months is sometimes considered metaphorically to represent the cycle of human life. The first nine months represent gestation before birth, while the tenth month represents the human in the world, the eleventh the end of his or her existence, and the twelfth the return to where he or she came from. The cycle thus goes from one spark or conception (rijal) to another, traversing through the void (suwung).

== Year designation ==
The Shalivahana era, which started in 78 CE and continues to be used on Bali, was used in Hindu times on Java, and for well over a century after the appearance of Islam on Java.

When Sultan Agung adopted the Islamic lunar calendar in 1633 CE, he did not adopt the Anno Hegirae to designate those years, but instead continued the count of the Shalivahana era, which was 1555 at the time. As a result, the Anno Javanico does not in effect count from any time.

=== Cycles of years ===
Eight tahun makes up a windu. A single windu lasts for 81 repetitions of the wetonan cycle, or 2,835 days (about 7 years 9 months in the Gregorian calendar). The tahun are lunar years, and of shorter length than Gregorian years. The names of the years in the cycle of windu are as follows (in krama/ngoko):

1. Purwana/Alip (354 days)
2. Karyana/Ehé (354 days)
3. Anama/Jemawal (355 days)
4. Lalana/Jé (354 days)
5. Ngawanga/Dal (355 days)
6. Pawaka/Bé (354 days)
7. Wasana/Wawu (354 days)
8. Swasana/Jimakir (355 days)

The windu are then grouped into a cycle of four:

1. Windu Adi
2. Windu Kunthara
3. Windu Sengara
4. Windu Sancaya

The cycles of wulan, tahun, and windu are derived from the Saka calendar.

Windu' are no longer used much in horoscopy, but there is evidence that it was previously used by court officials to predict trends. The passing of a windu is often seen as a milestone and deserving a slametan ritual feast.

=== Kurup ===
The kurup is a period of 120 tahun, or lunar years. There are thus 1440 lunar months, or 15 windu in a kurup. One day is dropped from the last month of Besar having 30 days, resulting in the last windu of the kurup having one less day than usual. Thus, the total number of days in a kurup is 42,524 (2,835 days in a windu x 15 windu - 1 day). This is the same number of days as in 120 lunar years of the tabular Islamic calendar.

Each kurup is named for date of the wetonan cycle on which the kurup commences. As this always falls in the Alip (first) year of the windu, it is prefixed with Alip. The current kurup started on Tuesday, March 24 of 1936 CE, which corresponds to Muharram 1 of 1355 AH in the tabular Islamic calendar, and will end on Sunday, August 25 of 2052 CE. As the wetonan date of that day was Selasa Pon, the kurup is named Alip Selasa Pon.

The next kurup will commence on Monday, August 26 of 2052 CE, which corresponds to Muharram 1 of 1475 AH in the tabular Islamic calendar, and will end on Saturday, January 28 of 2169 CE, and will be named Alip Senin Pahing.

== Dina Mulya ==
Dina Mulya (ꦢꦶꦤꦩꦸꦭꦾ, literally "noble days") are celebrated by worshipping Gusti, the creator of life and the universe. Practitioners of traditional Javanese spiritual teachings have preserved several noble days:

- Satu Sura, the first of Sura, the New Year
- Anggara Kasih : Tuesday Kliwon
- Dina Purnama: Jemuah Legi/Sukra Manis (Friday Legi)

== See also ==
- Old Javanese calendar, the calendar used before the creation of the Javanese calendar.
- Islamic calendar
- Pawukon calendar, a Balinese numeric calendar of 210 days per year
- Balinese saka calendar, a lunisolar calendar
- Sundanese calendar, a lunisolar calendar
