= Vāra (astronomy) =

Length of time in Indian astronomy

In Indian calendrical systems, vāra (or, vāsara) denotes the week-day. It is one of the five elements that constitute the traditional almanacs called Pañcāṅga-s the other four being Nakshatra, Tithi, Karaṇa and Nityayoga. The concept of week, the unit of time consisting of seven days, is not indigenous to Indian civilisation. The concept was probably borrowed by Babylonians and its use predates the use of the twelve zodiacal signs in Indian civilazation. The concept finds mention in Atharva Veda. The seven week-days are named after the seven classical planets as in the ancient Greek and Roman traditions.

== The rationale behind the naming of week days ==
The historical rationale behind the current naming of the week-days is astrological in origin and it can be summarized as given below. Surya-Siddhānta and Āryabhaṭīya have also indicated this rationale. Sūrya Siddhānta, in Chapter XII Bhūgolādhyāya Verses 78–79, says:

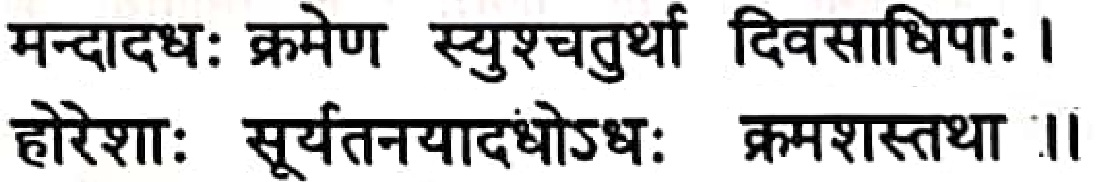
"The Lords of the days are to reckoned in order fourth from Saturn downwards. The Lords of the hours are also to be reckoned commencing from Saturn downwards."

Explanation of the rationale

Assume that the classical ancient planets be revolving round the earth. The planets are arranged in the order from slowest to fastest moving as they appear in the night sky, or equivalently, in the order from furthest to nearest to earth. The planets in this order are Saturn, Jupiter, Mars, Sun, Venus, Mercury and Moon. It is further assumed that a day is divided into 24 equal parts or hora-s. The planets are assigned to the 24 hora-s in the same order as indicated earlier one by one cyclically. On a given day, the cycle of planets will be repeated three times. The planet assigned to the first hora on a given day would be the planet immediately following the planet that was assigned to the 24th hora of the previous day. The name of the week-day on a given day will be the name associated with the planet associated with the first hora of the day. Thus, if the planet associated with the first hora of a day is Sun, the planet associated with the next day would be Moon, the planet associated with the third day would be Mars, and so on. The order of the weekdays thus becomes Sun, Moon, Mars, Mercury, Jupiter, Venus, Saturn.

This rationale is reflected in one of the literal meanings of the Sanskrit word vāsara (another term for vāra) which is "relating to or appearing in the morning".

== The concept of vāra in India ==
The rationale behind the naming of the days of a week is certainly not of Indian origin. Also the concept of a seven-day week as a unit of time is not of Indian origin. The system of dividing a day into 24 hora-s is there in India only in the astrological literature. Works on astronomy like Surya-Siddhānta and Āryabhaṭīya do not mention hora as unit of time. In such works, the common practice is to divide day into 60 ghaṭi-s and each ghaṭi into 60 vighaṭi-s. Moreover, no work of the Vedic and the Vedāṅga period mentions it. Further, the word hora is not even of Sanskrit origin. Chaldeans had this unit in use since a long time and they did have a week of seven-days. Vāra-s were known to Chaldeans long before 3800 BCE. It is probably the case that the ancient Indian astronomers and astrologers borrowed the concept of vāra or week from the Chaldeans.

The Atharva Veda contains references to vāra. From evidences obtained from Atharva Jyotiṣa and Yājñavalkya Smṛti, it has been determined that the vāra-s began to be used in a period much earlier than the period when the 12 zodiacal signs began to be used. Thus, in the Indian subcontinent, the use of vara-s predates the use of the rāśi-s. The days of the week may have been introduced in India at about 1000 BCE and they are not more modern than 500 BCE.

== The names of the vāra-s ==
The names of the vāra-s in all of the 22 languages recognized by the Constitution of India are given in the following table. For a longer list, see: Week-days in languages of the Indian subcontinent.

	Sunday the Sun (Sūrya, Ravi, Bhānu)	Monday the Moon (Chandra, Indu, Soma)	Tuesday Mars (Mangala)	Wednesday Mercury (Budha)	Thursday Jupiter (Bṛhaspati, Guru)	Friday Venus (Shukra)	Saturday Saturn (Shani)
Assamese	দেওবাৰ/ৰবিবাৰ; Deubar/Robibar	সোমবাৰ; Xombar	মঙ্গলবাৰ; Monggolbar	বুধবাৰ; Budhbar	বৃহস্পতিবাৰ; Brihôshpotibar	শুক্রবাৰ; Xukrobar	শনিবাৰ; Xonibar
Bengali	রবিবার/সূর্যবার; Rabibār/Sūryabār	সোমবার/চন্দ্রবার; Somabār/Chandrabār	মঙ্গলবার; Mangalbār	বুধবার; Budhabār	বৃহস্পতিবার/গুরুবার; Brihaspatibār/Gurubār	শুক্রবার; Shukrabār/^{[♀4]}	শনিবার; Shanibār
Bodo	Rabibar (रबिबार)	Sombar (समबार)	Mongolbar (मंगलबार)	Budhbar (बुधबार)	Brihospatibar (बृहस्पतीबार)	Sakrubar (शक्रुबार)	Shanibar (शनिबार)
Dogri	ऐतबार/तार; Taar	सङार/सोमबार; Sangaar	मंगलबार; Mangalvār	बुद्धबार; Budhvār	बीरबार; Bīrvār	शुक्करबार; Śukravār	शनीबार; Śanivār
Gujarati	રવિવાર; Ravivār	સોમવાર; Somvār	મંગળવાર; Mangaḷvār	બુધવાર; Budhvār	ગુરૂવાર; Guruvār	શુક્રવાર; Shukravār	શનિવાર; Shanivār
Hindi	रविवार/सूर्यवार; Ravivār/Sūryavār	सोमवार/चन्द्रवार; Somvār/Chandravār	मंगलवार; Mangalvār	बुधवार; Budhavār	गुरुवार; Guruvār	शुक्रवार; Shukravār	शनिवार; Shanivār
Kannada	ಭಾನುವಾರ; Bhanu Vaara	ಸೋಮವಾರ; Soma Vaara	ಮಂಗಳವಾರ; Mangala Vaara	ಬುಧವಾರ; Budha Vaara	ಗುರುವಾರ; Guru Vaara	ಶುಕ್ರವಾರ; Shukra Vaara	ಶನಿವಾರ; Shani Vaara
Kashmiri	آتھوار /aːtʰwaːr/	ژٔنٛدرٕوار /t͡səndrɨwaːr/	بوموار/ بۄنٛوار /boːmwaːr/ or /bɔ̃waːr/	بۄدوار /bɔdwaːr/	برَٛسوار/ برٛؠسوار /braswaːr/ or /brʲaswaːr/	شۆکُروار/ جُمعہ /ʃokurwaːr/ or /jumaːh/	بَٹہٕ وار /baʈɨwaːr/
Konkani	आयतार; Āytār	सोमार; Somaar	मंगळार; Mangaḷār	बुधवार; Budhavār	भीरेस्तार; Bhirestār	शुक्रार; Shukrār	शेनवार; Shenvār
Malayalam	ഞായര്‍ Nhāyar	തിങ്കള്‍ Tingal	ചൊവ്വ; Chovva	ബുധന്‍ Budhan	വ്യാഴം Vyāzham	വെള്ളി Velli	ശനി Shani
Manipuri	ꯅꯣꯡꯃꯥꯢꯖꯤꯡ (Nong-mai-jing)	ꯅꯤꯡꯊꯧꯀꯥꯕ (Ning-thou-kaa-ba)	ꯂꯩꯕꯥꯛꯄꯣꯛꯄ (Lei-baak-pok-pa)	ꯌꯨꯝꯁꯀꯩꯁ (Yoom-sa-kei-sa)	ꯁꯒꯣꯜꯁꯦꯟ (Sa-gol-sen)	ꯏꯔꯥꯢ (Ee-rai)	ꯊꯥꯡꯖ (Thaang-ja)
Marathi	रविवार; Ravivār	सोमवार; Somavār	मंगळवार; Mangaḷavār	बुधवार; Budhavār	गुरूवार; Guruvār	शुक्रवार; Shukravār	शनिवार; Shanivār
Maithili	𑒩𑒫𑒱𑒠𑒱𑒢; Ravidin	𑒮𑒼𑒧𑒠𑒱𑒢; Somdin	𑒧𑓀𑒑𑒪𑒠𑒱𑒢; Maṅgaldin	𑒥𑒳𑒡𑒠𑒱𑒢; Budhdin	𑒥𑒵𑒯𑒮𑓂𑒣𑒞𑒲𑒠𑒱𑒢; Brihaspatidin	𑒬𑒳𑒏𑓂𑒩𑒠𑒱𑒢; Śukradin	𑒬𑒢𑒲𑒠𑒱𑒢; Śanidin
Nepali	आइतवार; Aaitabar	सोमवार; Sombar	मंगलवार; Mangalbar	बुधवार; Budhabar	बिहिवार; Bihibar	शुक्रवार; Sukrabar	शनिवार; Sanibar
Odia	ରବିବାର; Rabibāra	ସୋମବାର; Somabāra	ମଙ୍ଗଳବାର; Maṅgaḷabāra	ବୁଧବାର; Budhabāra	ଗୁରୁବାର; Gurubāra	ଶୁକ୍ରବାର; Sukrabāra	ଶନିବାର; Sanibāra
Punjabi	ਐਤਵਾਰ; Aitvār	ਸੋਮਵਾਰ; Sōmvār	ਮੰਗਲਵਾਰ; Mangalvār	ਬੁੱਧਵਾਰ; Buddhvār	ਵੀਰਵਾਰ; Vīrvār	ਸ਼ੁੱਕਰਵਾਰ; Shukkarvār	ਸ਼ਨਿੱਚਰਵਾਰ; Shaniccharvār
Sanskrit	भानुवासर; Bhānuvāsara	इन्दुवासर; Induvāsara	भौमवासर; Bhaumavāsara	सौम्यवासर; Saumyavāsara	गुरुवासर; Guruvāsara	भृगुवासर; Bhṛguvāsara	स्थिरवासर; Sthiravāsara
Santhali	ᱥᱤᱸᱜᱩᱱ singi	ᱚᱛᱮ; Ote	ᱵᱟᱞᱮ; Bale	ᱥᱟ.ᱜᱩᱱ; Sagun	ᱥᱟ.ᱨᱫᱤ; Sardi	ᱡᱟ.ᱨᱩᱵ; Jarub	ᱧᱩᱸᱦᱩᱢ; Inguhum
Sindhi	Ācharu آچَرُ or Ārtvāru آرتوارُ	Sūmaru سُومَرُ	Angāro اَنڱارو or Mangalu مَنگلُ	Arbā اَربع or Budharu ٻُڌَرُ	Khamīsa خَميِسَ or Vispati وِسپَتِ	Jum'o جُمعو or Shukru شُڪرُ	Chancharu ڇَنڇَرُ or Śanscharu شَنسچَرُ
Tamil	ஞாயிறு Ñāyiṟu	திங்கள் Tiṅkaḷ	செவ்வாய் Cevvāy	புதன் Putaṉ	வியாழன் Viyāḻaṉ	வெள்ளி Veḷḷi	சனி Caṉi
Telugu	ఆదివారం Aadi Vāram	సోమవారం Soma Vāram	మంగళవారం Mangala Vāram	బుధవారం Budha Vāram	గురువారం Guru Vāram	శుక్రవారం Sukra Vāram	శనివారం Sani Vāram
Urdu	Itwār اتوار	Pīr پیر^{[☽4]}	Mangal منگل	Budh بدھ	Jumerāt جمعرات	Jum'ah جمعہ^{[♀4]}	Haftah ہفتہ ^{[♄6]}

== See also ==
- Nakshatra
- Tithi
- Karaṇa
- Nityayoga
- Planetary hours
