= Nityayoga =

Period of time in Indian astronomy

Today (at UTC+00)
- Tuesday, 25 August 2026
- Hindu: 5127 KY・1,872,812・Rāudra・Ayuṣmān; Solar: 9 Bhādrapada, 1948 SE; Lunisolar: Trayodaśī, Śukla pakṣa of Śrāvaṇa, 2083 VE
Other calendars
Armenian	6 Hoṙi 1476
Aztec	Atemoztli 7, 7 Cuāuhtli
Babylonian	11 Abu, 2337 SE
Balinese pawukon	Luang, Pepet, Beteng, Sri, Wage, Was, Anggara of Matal, Ludra, Ogan, Raja
Bengali	10 Bhadro, BS 1433
Chinese	Yin Metal Goat・Tail Mansion; 13 Qīyuè, Bǐngwǔnián (Chushu, 13 days until Bailu)
Common Era	25 August 2026 CE
Coptic	19 Mesori, AM 1742
Egyptian	11 Tybi, 2775 NE
Ethiopian	19 Naḥasē, 2018 Amätä Məhrät
French Republican	Décade I, Octidi de Fructidor de l'Année 234 de la République
Gregorian	25 August, AD 2026
Hebrew	12 Elul, AM 5786
Icelandic	Þriðjudagur, 1 Tvímánuður 2026
Islamic	11 Rabi' al-awwal, AH 1448 (using tabular method)
ISO week date	2026-W35-2
Japanese	13 Fumizuki, Reiwa 8 (Shosho, 13 days until Hakuro)
Julian	12 August, AD 2026 (AM 7534)
Julian day	2461278
Maya	13.0.13.15.15; 8 Mol, 7 Men
Roman	Pridie Idus Augustas, MMDCCLXXIX AUC
Solar Hijri	3 Shahrivar, SH 1405

Orbital simulation illustrating the calculation of nityayoga

In Indian astronomy, yoga (also called nityayoga) is a period of time, of varying lengths, during which the sum of the nirayana longitudes of the Sun and the Moon increases by an amount of 13 degrees 20 minutes (or, equivalently, 800 minutes). While considering the sum, when the sum is 360 degrees or more, then 360 degrees is subtracted from the sum to make the sum an angle between 0 degree and 360 minutes. Consider a moment T_{1} when the sum of the longitudes of the Sun and the Moon is 0 degree and let T_{2} be the next immediate moment when the sum of the longitudes of the Sun and the Moon is 13 degree 20 minutes. The duration of time between the moments T_{1} and T_{2} is the first yoga. Similarly, let the next immediate moment when the sum of the longitudes of the Sun and Moon is 26 degrees 40 minutes. The duration of time between the moments T_{2} and T_{3} is the second yoga. The third, fourth and higher yoga-s are defined in a similar way. Since 27 X 13 degrees 20 minutes = 360 degrees, at the end-moment of the 27th yoga, the sum of the nirayana longitudes of the Sun and Moon would be 0 degree. The numbering of the yoga-s then starts afresh from that point. It appears that the astronomical yoga-s are in no way related to any astronomical phenomena. S. B. Dikshit in his Bhāratīya Jyotiṣ Śāstra observes: "It is not known what planetary position in the sky is indicated by yoga, and it is useful only in astrology."

In Indian astrology, the term yoga has been used to indicate luni-solar distances and planetary situations, associations, and combinations. When one planet or house is related to another by placement, aspect or conjunction in a particular way then it is said that the planets and houses are in a particular yoga.

In the traditional Indian calendars or almanacs, that is in Pañcāṅg-s, Yoga or Nityayoga is one of the five elements or organs or limbs that constitute the Pañcāṅg-s, the "five organs" in the literary meaning of the term Pañcāṅg. The other four elements are Nakṣatra, Tithi, Vāra and Karaṇa.

== Names ==
The names of the 27 nitayoga are:

1. Viṣkaṃbha (Support or obstacle)
2. Prīti (Kindness, fondness)
3. Āyuṣmān (Long lived)
4. Saubhāgya (Good fortune)
5. Śobhana (Prosperity, splendor)
6. Atigaṇḑa (Having large cheeks or temples)
7. Sukarmā (Virtuous)
8. Dhṛti (Courage, determination)
9. Śūla (Spear, pike)
10. Gaṇḑa (Spot, mark, pimple)
11. Vṛddhi (Growth)
12. Dhruva (Unchangeable, constant)
13. Vyāghāta (Hindrance, defeat)
14. Harṣaṇa (Thrilling)
15. Vajra (Diamond, thunderbolt)
16. Siddhi (Success)
17. Vyātīpāta (Calamity)
18. Varīyān (Very welcome)
19. Parigha (Obstacle)
20. Śiva (Benign, gracious)
21. Siddha (Accomplished)
22. Sādhya (Amenable)
23. Śubha (Auspicious)
24. Śukla (White substance)
25. Brahma (Supreme spirit, priest)
26. Indra (Chief)
27. Vaidhṛta (Great calamity)

== History of the yoga concept ==
Nityayoga or yoga has a prominent place in traditional Indian almanac known as Pañcāṅg. It is one of the five elements that constitutes the pañcāṅg-s, that is, the five elements that define a Pañcāṅg. However, the yoga-s entered the Pañcāṅg calculations only several centuries after the other four elements became parts of the Indian alamanac. Pancha-siddhantika, a text on astronomy composed around 505 CE by Varāhamihira gives the methods of calculating nakṣatra-s and tithi-s but does not give any method for calculating yoga-s. Similarly, Bṛhat Saṃhitā, a work on astrology also by Varāhamihira has long discussions on the effects of nakṣatra-s but is silent on the effects of yoga-s. These facts indicate that the concept of yoga-s did not exist at the time of Varāhamihira. The currently available Brāhmasphuṭasiddhānta composed by Brahmagupta in c.628 CE has just one verse containing a reference to yoga, but all internal evidences point to the possibility of the verse being a much later interpolation. Khaṇḍakhādyaka, another treatise composed by Brahmagupta in c.665 CE has a couplet of verses referring to yoga. These verses have also been determined as later interpolations. All these point to the fact that the concept of yoga in astronomy arose post Brahmagupta. Lalla (c. 720–790 CE) in his Śiṣyadhīvṛddhidatantra mentions the yoga-s in detail. Surya Siddhanta, the founding text of the Saura-pakṣa in Indian astronomy, of undetermined authorship believed to have been composed in the 4th-5th century CE but again believed to have undergone a substantial revision in around 800 CE presents the list of all the 27 yoga-s as they are used in modern Pañcāṅg-s and also methods of calculating the yoga-s. All these evidences suggest that the concept of yoga arose sometime around 700 CE and became an integral part of the Pañcāṅg-s only after around 700 CE.

== On the origin of the concept of yoga ==
The word vyātīpāta occurs in two verses in Brāhmasphuṭasiddhānta, but from the context of the occurrence of the word, it is clear that it is not referring to the vyātīpāta that occurs as the 17th yoga in the list of 27 yoga-s. It is referring to one of two mahāpāta-s which occur when the Sun and the Moon are in parallel declination and this happens when the sum of the longitudes of the Sun and Moon is 180°. There are two moments in every lunar month when this happens. One of them is called the vyātīpāta and other vaidhṛti. In order to find these mahāpāta-s one has find the sum of the longitudes of the Sun and the Moon. This must have led to the idea of finding yoga-s by finding the sum of longitudes just as tithi is determined by the difference of longitudes.

There is another theory regarding the origin of the yoga concept in Indian astronomy. According this view, the astronomical yoga came into being in attempts to predict the phenomena of eclipses.

== Determination of Yoga ==
Robert Sewell's The Indian Calendar contains a section which explains in meticulous detail how the Yoga at sunrise on a day specified by a date in the Common Era can be determined. The procedure also explains how to find how much time has elapsed at the moment of sunrise since the beginning of the Yoga.

== Lengths of Yoga-s ==
The lengths of the various yoga-s varies from yoga to yoga. The following table gives the mean length, the greatest length and the least length of the yoga-s. It follows that the total length of a yoga-cycle consisting of 27 yoga-s is 26 days 10 hours 12 minutes 47 seconds.

Lengths of Yoga-s
	Hours	Minutes	Seconds
Mean	22	35	44.7
Greatest	24	36	24
Least	20	52	58

== A different system of yoga-s ==
There is a different system of yoga-s in use in India. This system consists of 28 yoga-s, in contrast to 27 yoga-s in the system already explained, and the names and the rules for the determination of these yoga-s are different from the ones given earlier. In this system, the succession of the yoga-s depends the day of the week. Hence it has absolutely no connection whatsoever with any astronomical phenomena as the week has no definable relation to the motion of the moon or the sun. This system of yoga-s do not find any mention in Sūrya-sddhānta. In some Hindu calendars yoga-s of this system are also given for each day of the month. But these yogas are only of astrological interest.

The names as well as the rules for the determination of the 28 yoga-s as given in Śrīpati's Jyotiṡa Ratnamāla are given below.

=== Names of the 28 yoga-s in the different system ===
1. Ānanda
2. Kāladaṇḍa
3. Dhūmra
4. Prajāpati
5. Saumya
6. Dhvānkṣa
7. Dhvaja
8. Śrīvatsa
9. Vajra
10. Mudgara
11. Chattra
12. Maitra
13. Mānasa
14. Padma
15. Lambaka
16. Utpāta
17. Mrtyu
18. Kāṇa
19. Siddhi
20. Śubha
21. Amṛta
22. Musala
23. Gada
24. Mātaṅga
25. Rākṣasa
26. Cara
27. Sthira
28. Pravardha

=== Rule for assigning the yoga-s in the different system ===
The rule assumes a cycle of 28 nakṣatra-s which includes the 28th nakṣatra, namely, Abhijit. The 28 yoga-s are assigned as follows:

- If on a day, if the week day is Sunday and the nakṣatra is Aśvinī, the yoga is Ānanda, if the nakṣatra is Bharaṇī the yoga is Kāladaṇḍa, and so on.
- If on a day, if the week day is Monday and the nakṣatra is Mṛgaśīrṣa, the yoga is Ānanda, if the nakṣatra is Ārdrā the yoga is Kāladaṇḍa, and so on.
- If on a day, if the week day is Tuesday and the nakṣatra is Āśleṣa, the yoga is Ānanda, if the nakṣatra is Magha the yoga is Kāladaṇḍa, and so on.
- If on a day, if the week day is Wednesday and the nakṣatra is Hasta, the yoga is Ānanda, if the nakṣatra is Citra the yoga is Kāladaṇḍa, and so on.
- If on a day, if the week day is Thursday and the nakṣatra is Anurādha, the yoga is Ānanda, if the nakṣatra is Jyeṣtha the yoga is Kāladaṇḍa, and so on.
- If on a day, if the week day is Friday and the nakṣatra is Uttara-āṣādha, the yoga is Ānanda, if the nakṣatra is Śrāvaṇa the yoga is Kāladaṇḍa, and so on.
- If on a day, if the week day is Saturday and the nakṣatra is Śatabhiṣaj, the yoga is Ānanda, if the nakṣatra is Pūrva-bhādrapada the yoga is Kāladaṇḍa, and so on.

== See also ==
- Nakshatra
- Karaṇa
- Tithi
- Vāra
- Vyatipāta
