= Karaṇa (pañcāṅga) =

Duration of time in Indian astronomy

In Indian astronomy, a karaṇa is a half of a tithi. It is the duration of time in which the difference of the longitudes of the Sun and the Moon is increased by 6 degrees. A lunar month has 30 tithi-s and so the number of karaṇa-s in a lunar month is 60. These sixty karaṇa-s are not individually named. Instead, the originators of the concept have chosen 11 names to be associated with the karaṇa-s which means several karaṇa-s will be associated with the same name. Of these 11 names, four are fixed or immovables (or sthira-s) in the sense that they are associated with four unique karaṇa-s in a lunar month. These constant names are Śakuni, Catuṣpāda, Nāga and Kimstughna. The remaining seven names are variable or movable (or, cara-s) in the sense that there are several karaṇa-s associated with each of them. These names are Bava, Bālava, Kaulava, Taitila, Gara, Vaṇij and Vṛṣṭi.

== Assignment of names ==
The four fixed names are assigned as follows:

Kṛṣṇa pakṣa caturdasi second half	:	Śakuni
Amāvāsya first half	:	Catuṣpāda
Amāvāsya second half	:	Nāga
Śukla pakṣa pratipad first half	:	Kimstughna

The fifty-six half tithi-s starting from the Śukla pakṣa pratipad second half to Kṛṣṇa pakṣa caturdasi first half are given the variable names Bava, Bālava, Kaulava, Taitila, Gara, Vaṇij and Vṛṣṭi in a cyclical order. These names are repeated in the same order eight times so that the same name is assigned to eight different half tithi-s.

The fixed and variable names are assigned as in the following table.

Names of karaṇa-s
Pakṣa	Tithi	Half	Name	Pakṣa	Tithi	Half	Name
Śukla	Pratipad	First	Kimstughna	Kṛṣṇa	...	...	...
,,	,,	Second	Bava	,,	Ekādasi	First	Bava
,,	Dvitīya	First	Bālava	,,	,,	Second	Bālava
,,	,,	Second	Kaulava	,,	Dvādaśī	First	Kaulava
,,	Tṛtīya	First	Taitila	,,	,,	Second	Taitila
,,	,,	Second	Gara	,,	Trayodaśī	First	Gara
,,	Caturthi	First	Vaṇij	,,	,,	Second	Vaṇij
,,	,,	Second	Vṛṣṭi	,,	Caturdaśī	First	Vṛṣṭi
,,	Pañcami	First	Bava	,,	,,	Second	Śakuni
,,	,,	Second	Bālava	,,	Amāvāsya	First	Catuṣpāda
,,	...	...	...	,,	,,	Second	Nāga

== Algorithm to determine the karaṇa ==
The name of the karaṇa at a particular moment on any given day can be determined by the following algorithm.

1. Let the longitudes of the Sun and the Moon be S and M respectively at a particular moment on a given day.
2. If M >= S, then D = M - S.
3. If M < S, then D = (M - S) + 360°.
4. Divide D by 6°. Let K be the quotient (an integer).
5. If K = 57, 58, 59, or 0 then the karaṇa is Śakuni, Catuṣpāda, Nāga, or Kimstughna in that order.
6. Otherwise, if K > 7, subtract the nearest multiple of 7 from K and let N be the resulting number.
7. Then the karaṇa at the particular moment is the N-th karaṇa in the list of seven variable karaṇa-s, namely, Bava, Bālava, Kaulava, Taitila, Gara, Vaṇij and Vṛṣṭi.
8. Mathematically, we may consider the fraction of a full rotation between the Moon and the Sun as F = (M - S)/360°. Then, the currently ongoing karaṇa is K = floor(60*F). If K ≡ any of 57, 58, 59, 60 (modulo 60) , the name of the karaṇa is Śakuni, Catuṣpāda, Nāga, or Kimstughna respectively. Otherwise, for K ≡ 1 to 56 (modulo 60), we must consider N = (K % 60) % 7. For each of the 7 possible values of N from 0 to 6, the corresponding name of the karaṇa is Vṛṣṭi, Bava, Bālava, Kaulava, Taitila, Gara, or Vaṇij respectively.

== Karaṇa names in Malayalam ==
In the Malayalam astronomical literature, the eleven karaṇas are assigned names which are words for various animals. The English equivalents of the animal words representing the various karaṇas are given below.

Karaṇa name	Malayalam name	Meaning of Malayalam
		name in English
Śakuni	പുള്ള്	Shikra
Catuṣpāda	നാൽക്കാലി	Quadruped
Nāga	പാമ്പ്	Snake
Kimstughna	പുഴു	Worm
Bava	സിംഹം	Lion
Bālava	പുലി	Tiger
Kaulava	പന്നി	Pig
Taitila	കഴുത	Donkey
Gara	ആന	Elephant
Vaṇij	പശു	Cow
Vṛṣṭi	പട്ടി	Dog

== Origin and history of the concept of karaṇa ==
Most probably the concept of karaṇa arose almost simultaneously with the concept of tithi. Tithi-s are related to lunar-days and lunar-days are similar in concept to solar days or sāvana days. A sāvana day is the duration of time from one sunrise to the next sunrise. Roughly one half of a sāvana day is the duration of time from sunrise to the next sunset and the other half is the duration of time from sunset to the next sunrise. Before the introduction of the modern concept of tithi, the concept of a lunar day was in vogue. It was the duration of time from one moon-rise to the next moon-rise. Similar to the division of a sāvana day, the lunar-day can also be divided into two halves: One half being the duration of time from moon-rise to the next moon-set (the lunar day time) and the other half being the duration of time from moon-set to the next moon-rise (lunar night time). The concept of karaṇa has originated in this division of the lunar day. Later, when the concept of tithi got established, the concepts of the lunar day time and lunar night time got replaced by the modern artificial concept of half-tithi-s. The works of the Vedāṅga period - Atharva Jyotiṣa and Ṛk-pariśiṣṭa mention the karaṇa-s. So the origination of the concept of karaṇa-s can be traced to as early as the period of Vedāṅga Jyotiṣa, that is, around 500 BCE.

== See also ==
- Nakshatra
- Tithi
- Nityayoga
- Vāra
