= Tithi =

Lunar day in the Hindu calendar

The astronomical basis of the Hindu lunar day

In Vedic timekeeping, a tithi is a "duration of two faces of moon that is observed from earth", known as milа̄lyа̄ (Newar: 𑐩𑐶𑐮𑐵𑐮𑑂𑐫𑐵𑑅, मिलाल्याः) in Nepal Bhasa, or the time it takes for the longitudinal angle between the Moon and the Sun to increase by 12°. In other words, a tithi is a time duration between the consecutive epochs that correspond to when the longitudinal angle between the Sun and the Moon is an integer multiple of 12°. Tithis begin at varying times of day and vary in duration approximately from 19 to 26 hours. Every day of a lunar month is called tithi.

== Duration and variability ==
A tithi is defined as the time taken for the longitudinal angle between the Sun and the Moon to increase by 12°. While the average duration is approximately 23 hours 37 minutes, actual tithi lengths vary from about 19 hours, 59 minutes to 26 hours, 47 minutes depending on the Moon’s elliptical orbit and variable speed in the ecliptic.This variation is a result of the Moon’s non-uniform motion as described in Indian astronomical treatises such as the Surya Siddhānta and confirmed through modern astronomical observations.

== Calculation methods: traditional vs modern ==
Traditional Panchāngas often compute tithi boundaries using mean motions of the Sun and Moon as given in the Sūrya Siddhānta and later siddhāntic texts. These methods produce approximate times for tithi transitions. In contrast, modern almanacs generated by astronomical institutions use true longitudes derived from high-precision ephemerides (e.g., NASA JPL DE series).These differences in calculation can result in discrepancies of several minutes, and in rare cases, up to an hour, between traditional and modern Panchāngas.

== Panchanga ==
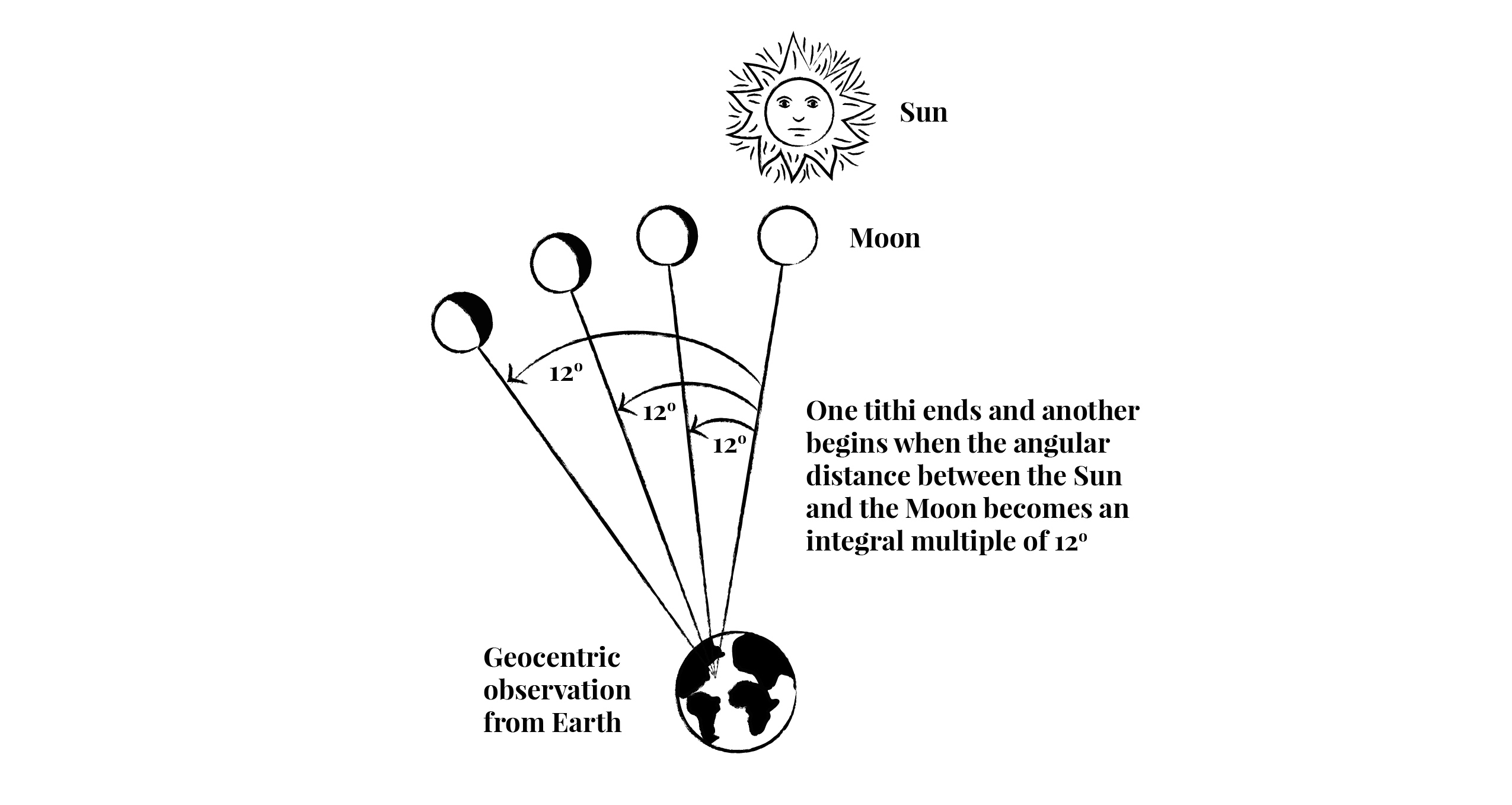
image to understand the calculation of tithi

A Hindu muhurta (forty-eight minute duration) can be represented in five attributes of Hindu astronomy namely, vara the weekday, tithi, nakshatra the Moon's asterism, yoga the angular relationship between the Sun and Moon and karana half of tithi.

Tithi plays an important role along with nakshatra in Hindus' daily as well as special activities in selecting the muhurta. There are auspicious tithis as well as inauspicious tithis, each considered more propitious for some purposes than for other.

In amānta lunar calendars, tithis are counted beginning at śukla pratipada, while in the pūrṇimānta lunar calendars, tithis are counted from kr̥ṣṇa pratipada. The śukla tithis are when the moon waxes, and the kr̥ṣṇa tithis are when the moon wanes. The average tithi lasts 23 hours 37.5 minutes, and can range from 19 hours 59 minutes to 26 hours 47 minutes. The calculation of tithi timings may also differ on whether one uses the traditional methods for calculating the Sun and Moon's movement as promulgated in the Sūrya Siddhānta or modern methods which correctly calculate the true motions of the Sun and Moon. The tithi in place at sunrise is considered the "tithi of the day", although the tithi may end before the next sunrise in which case the next tithi begins. Because the length of a tithi is also variable a case can arise where a tithi begins after sunrise and ends prior to the next sunrise, which is called a kṣaya tithi. The opposite phenomenon can occur where a tithi in place during a sunrise is still present in the following sunrise which is called an adhika or ahorātra tithi.

There are 30 tithis in each lunar month, named as:

Sl.No	Kr̥ṣṇa pakṣa (dark fortnight)	Śukla pakṣa (bright fortnight)
1	Pratipada	Pratipada
2	Dvitīyā	Dvitīyā
3	Tr̥tīyā	Tr̥tīyā
4	Caturthī	Caturthī
5	Pañcamī	Pañcamī
6	Ṣaṣṭhī	Ṣaṣṭhī
7	Saptamī	Saptamī
8	Aṣṭamī	Aṣṭamī
9	Navamī	Navamī
10	Daśamī	Daśamī
11	Ekādaśī	Ekādaśī
12	Dvādaśī	Dvādaśī
13	Trayodaśī	Trayodaśī
14	Caturdaśī	Caturdaśī
15	Amāvasyā (new moon)	Pūrṇimā (full moon)

== See also ==
Tithi is one of the five elements of a Pañcāṅga. The other four elements:

- Nakshatra
- Karaṇa
- Nityayoga
- Vāra
