= Worship in Hinduism =

Act of religious devotion usually directed to one or more Hindu deities

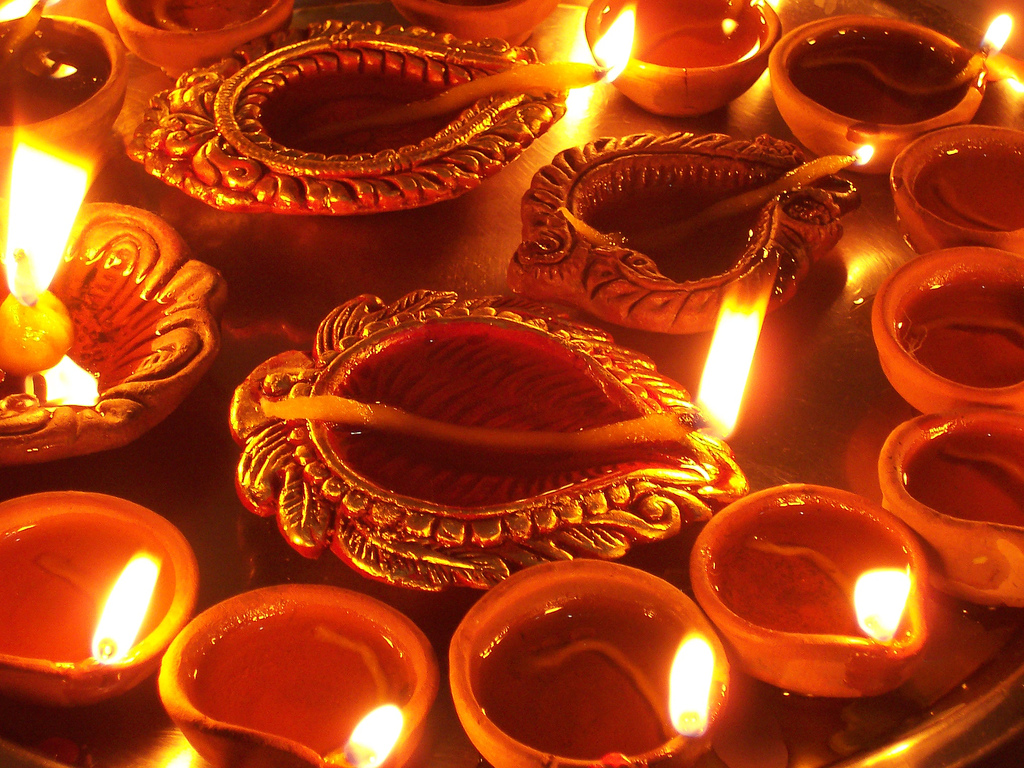
A tray of diya oil lamps, part of the Diwali festival

Worship in Hinduism is an act of religious devotion, usually directed to one or more Hindu deities, that invokes a sense of bhakti (devotional love). The concept of bhakti is central in Hinduism. Worship in Hinduism takes many forms, and its expressions vary depending on geographical, linguistic, and cultural factors. Hindu worship is not limited to a particular place, and may be performed in temples and within the home. It often incorporates personal reflection, music, dance, poetry, rituals, and ceremonies. It serves various purposes, including seeking blessings, guidance, or specific outcomes, as well as fostering a sense of inner peace and spiritual growth. It can also be an expression of devotion (bhakti) to the deity. The aim of Hindu worship is to lead a pure life in order to progress spiritually and eventually attain liberation (moksha) from the cycle of rebirth (samsara).

== Etymology and terminology ==
The term bhakti comes from the Sanskrit root bhaj, which can mean "distribute", "share", "revere", "serve", "cultivate" or "practise". It shares its linguistic root with related devotional terms like Bhagavān (the personal Lord) and bhajana (devotional singing), with this highlighting a mutual relationship of shared devotion and grace between the worshipper and God. In Hindu traditions, bhakti is not limited to a single emotion but has religious, personal and social dimensions.

The word bhakti itself appears in the concluding verse (6.23) of the Śvetāśvatara Upaniṣad (c. 500 BCE), where it describes devotion directed to the deity and equally to one's guru (spiritual teacher). Classical texts like the Bhakti-sūtras define devotion as "supreme love" (parama-premarūpā) for God, marked by a single-minded focus (ananyatā) on the divine.

Devotional literature also relies on several key Sanskrit terms with specific meanings:

- Avatāra: Means "descent," referring to the divine manifesting in worldly conditions to restore order (dharma).
- Mokṣa: Refers to release or liberation from conditions of ignorance, impermanence, and suffering (saṃsāra).
- Puṣṭi: Translates to "nourishment," referring to the divine grace (anugraha) of the Lord.
- Viraha: Refers to the acute pain of separation from the divine, which acts as a means of focusing the devotee single-mindedly on God.

== Deities ==
Within Hinduism many personal gods (ishvaras or ishtadevas) are worshipped as murtis (sacred images). These beings are either aspects of the supreme Brahman, avatars of the supreme being, or significantly powerful entities known as devas. The exact nature of belief in regard to each deity varies between differing Hindu denominations and philosophies. Often, these beings are depicted in humanoid or partially humanoid forms, complete with a set of unique and complex iconography in each case. These deities may be different, but they are generally all considered forms of the one god (Brahman). These deities and their pujas (religious rituals) provide one of the ways to communicate with this one divinity.

=== Murti ===
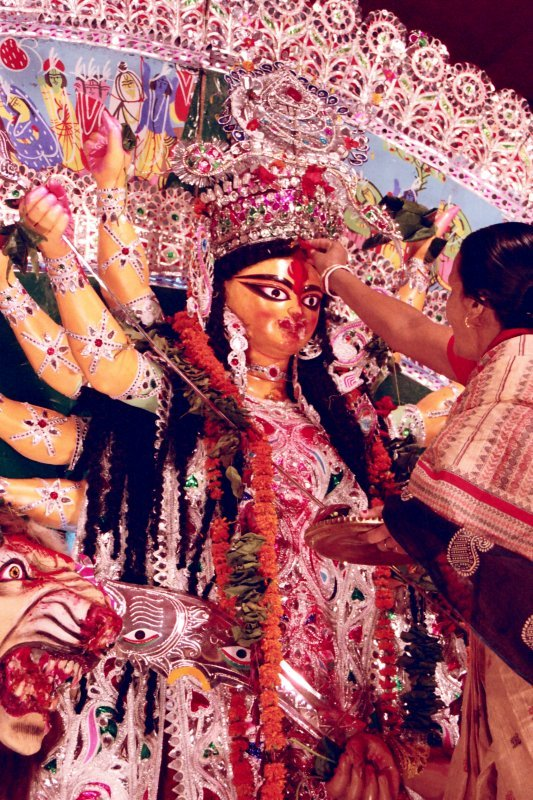
Sindoor being applied on the forehead of Goddess Durga during Durga Puja

In Hinduism, a murti is an embodiment of the divine, the Ultimate Reality or Brahman. In a religious context, murtis are found in Hindu temples or homes, where they may be treated as a beloved guest and serve as a participant of puja rituals.

A murti is installed by priests in Hindu temples through the Prana Pratishtha ceremony. During the consecration (prāṇa-pratiṣṭhā) of a sacred image (mūrti), the sculptor (śilpin) paints the deity's eyes last. After the sacred image is infused with life-breath (prāṇa) through ritual chants, its first look is directed towards sweets or a mirror before worshippers look at it.

Devotional practice also distinguishes between saguṇa devotion (devotion to personal deities with physical form and attributes) and nirguṇa devotion (devotion to an ultimate reality without form or attributes). In traditions like Śrī Vaiṣṇavism, a consecrated sacred image in a temple is understood as an arcāvatāra, which is a direct manifestation of the divine in physical form that allows worshippers to both approach and interact with God.

There is also an utsava murti ("mobile image of god") which is used for processions and various festive celebrations. Unlike the installed, main image of the deity in Hindu temples, these murtis can be taken out of the temple and paraded during special occasions, processions, and festivals. Devotional (bhakti) practices centered on cultivating a deep and personal bond of love with God often include veneration of murtis. Acts of devotion can include awakening the murti in the morning and making sure that it "is scrubbed, clothed, and garlanded." Furthermore, the building of a temple for the murti is considered the highest act of devotion.

In daily temple practice, like the Vallabha Puṣṭi-mārga tradition, worship of the sacred image is structured around eight daily viewings (darśan). The mūrti is treated with personal care reflecting the seasons, including gentle awakening with music, applying cooling sandalwood paste and light clothing in summer, and offering daily meals. Temple worship (pūjā) before a sacred icon (mūrti) engages all five senses through music, water, lamps, and incense. Food offered during worship is believed to be consumed by the mūrti and returned to devotees as food that has been blessed (prasād).

== Puja ==
Pūjā (Sanskrit: पूजा, meaning reverence, honour, adoration, or worship), sometimes spelt 'pooja', is a religious ritual performed by Hindus as an offering to various deities, distinguished persons, or special guests. It is performed on a variety of occasions and settings, from daily puja done in the home, to temple ceremonies and large festivals, or to begin a new venture. A priest determines the timing of puja by consulting the pancanga (ritual calendar), which indicates auspicious dates and times for religious ceremonies. Puja rituals range from simple offerings of water, flowers, and incense in domestic shrines to the elaborate 16 upacharas in temples. Physical expressions of humility, like the namaste gesture, bending, or full prostration, accompany puja. Many Hindus equate it with prayer in English, but puja is distinct, involving tangible offerings to deity images. The puja concludes with aarti. The offerings given during puja, like food and flowers, are returned to worshippers as prasada, believed to carry the deity's blessings. This prasada is often shared with others, extending the puja's benefits.

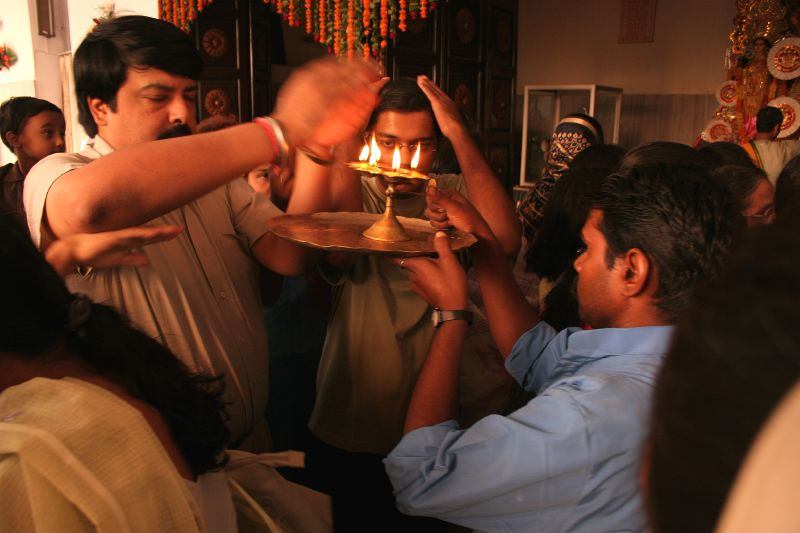
Taking Aarti blessing

=== Arti ===
Arti is a Hindu ritual of worship, a part of puja, in which light from a flame (e.g. wicks fuelled by ghee (purified butter) or camphor) is offered to one or more deities. Arti is generally performed one to five times a day, and usually at the end of a puja (in South India) or bhajan session (in North India). It is performed during almost all Hindu ceremonies and occasions. During the arti, light from the flame (usually in the form of an arti plate or lamp) is circulated around a person or deity. It is generally accompanied by the singing of songs in praise of that deity or person. Many versions of such hymns exist, and they are also known as arti. Hindus believe that, in doing so, the flame of the arti acquires the power and grace of the deity. After this, the priest circulates the flame, contained in the plate or lamp, to those present during the ritual. The participants first cup their down-turned hands over the flame and then raise their fingers to their eyes—the purificatory blessing, passed from the deity's image to the flame, has now been passed to the devotee.

=== Darśana ===
Darśana or Darshan is a Sanskrit term meaning "sight" (seeing or beholding), vision, apparition, or glimpse. It is most commonly used for theophany—"manifestation / visions of the divine" in Hindu worship, e.g. of a deity (especially in image form), or a very holy person or artifact. One could also "receive" darśana of the deity in the temple, or from a great saintly person, such as a great guru.

In Hindu devotional traditions (bhakti), darśana is not just looking passively; it is viewed as an active experience of seeing and being seen by the deity. Although temple worship (pūjā) includes physical offerings and sensory rituals, its central moment is this shared gaze between the deity and the worshipper. Through it, the deity is believed to welcome devotees and reveal divine presence. For example, at the Veṅkaṭeśvara temple in Tirumala, the deity is awakened early in the morning specifically to receive pilgrims gathered for its darśana.

Darśana also goes beyond visiting the temple physically to include inner, meditative sight (līlā smaraṇa) in traditions like Caitanya Vaiṣṇavism and Vallabha's Puṣṭi-mārga. Through devotional poetry, music, and meditation, worshippers develop an inner vision that allows them to "see" and join in the divine's eternal pastimes (līlā) within their own hearts.

== Homa, Havan and Yajna ==
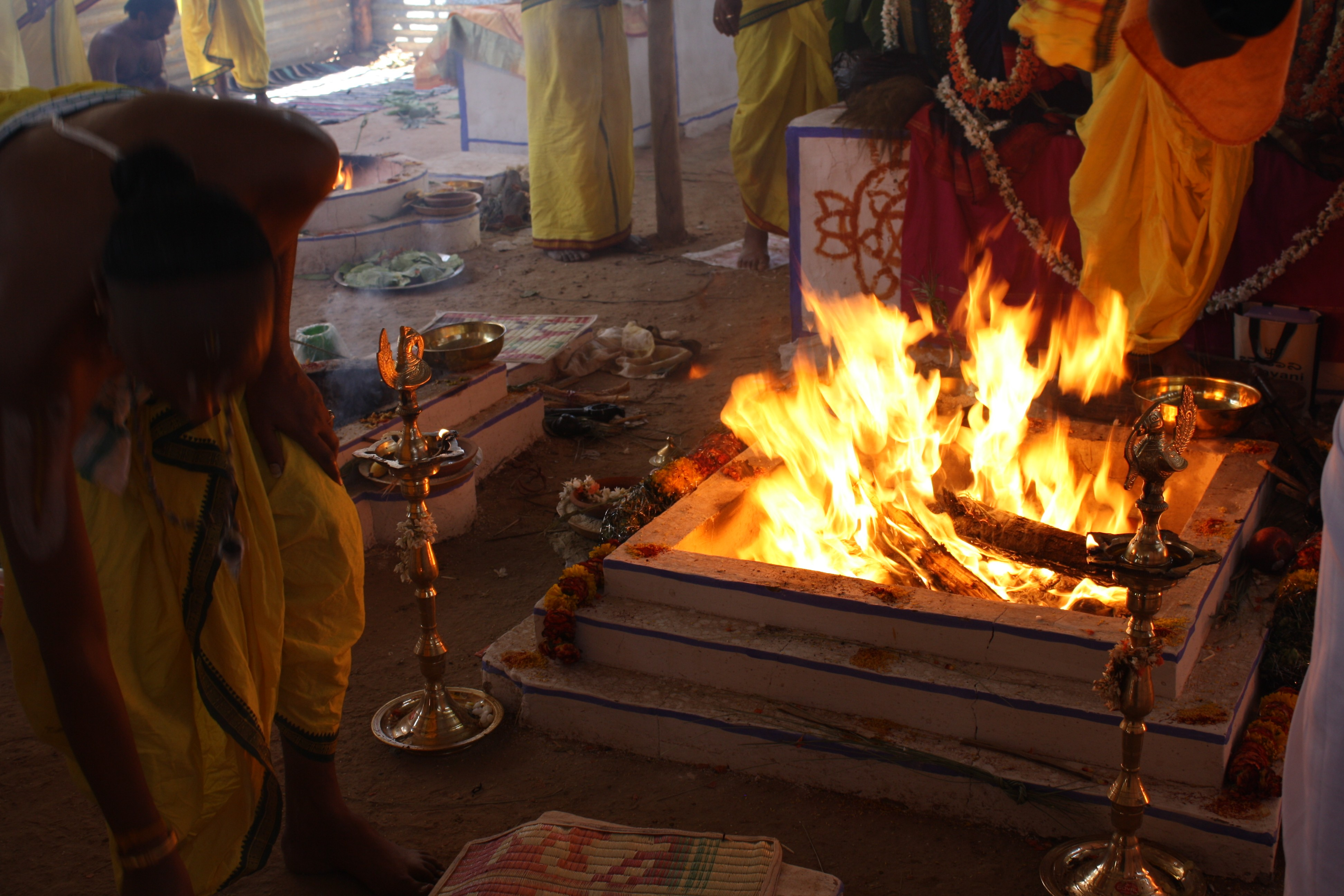
A Yajna being performed

Homa (also known as homam or havan) is a Sanskrit word which refers to any ritual in which making offerings into a consecrated fire is the primary action. At present, the words homa/homam and havan are interchangeable with the word yajna.

Yajna is a ritual of sacrifice derived from the practice of Vedic times. It is performed to please the gods or to attain certain wishes. Early Vedic thought regarded yajna as a fundamental ritual that created and maintained cosmic and moral order (dharma). This idea was associated with the sacrifice of the cosmic being (puruṣa) described in Rig Veda 10.90.

The sacred fire, personified as the god Agni, is a central part of the ritual. Agni is regarded as the god of the hearth and a messenger between humans and the gods. A Vedic (Śrauta) yajna is typically performed by an adhvaryu priest reciting Vedic verses. Usually, there will be one or three fires in the centre of the offering ground. Items offered as oblations in the yajna include large quantities of ghee, milk, grains, cakes, or soma. The duration of a yajna depends on the type; some can last a few minutes, hours, or days, and some even last for years. Some yajnas are performed privately, others with many people in attendance.

Over time the meaning of yajna broadened in Hindu philosophy. The Upaniṣads reinterpreted the fire sacrifice symbolically as an "inner sacrifice," where one offers their thoughts, feelings, and breath into the "fire" of self-discovery. Later, the Bhagavad-gītā presented yajna as an attitude of selfless action, with it teaching that any everyday duty or humble gift like a leaf, flower, fruit, or water given with love is received as a true sacrifice.

== Substances and objects ==
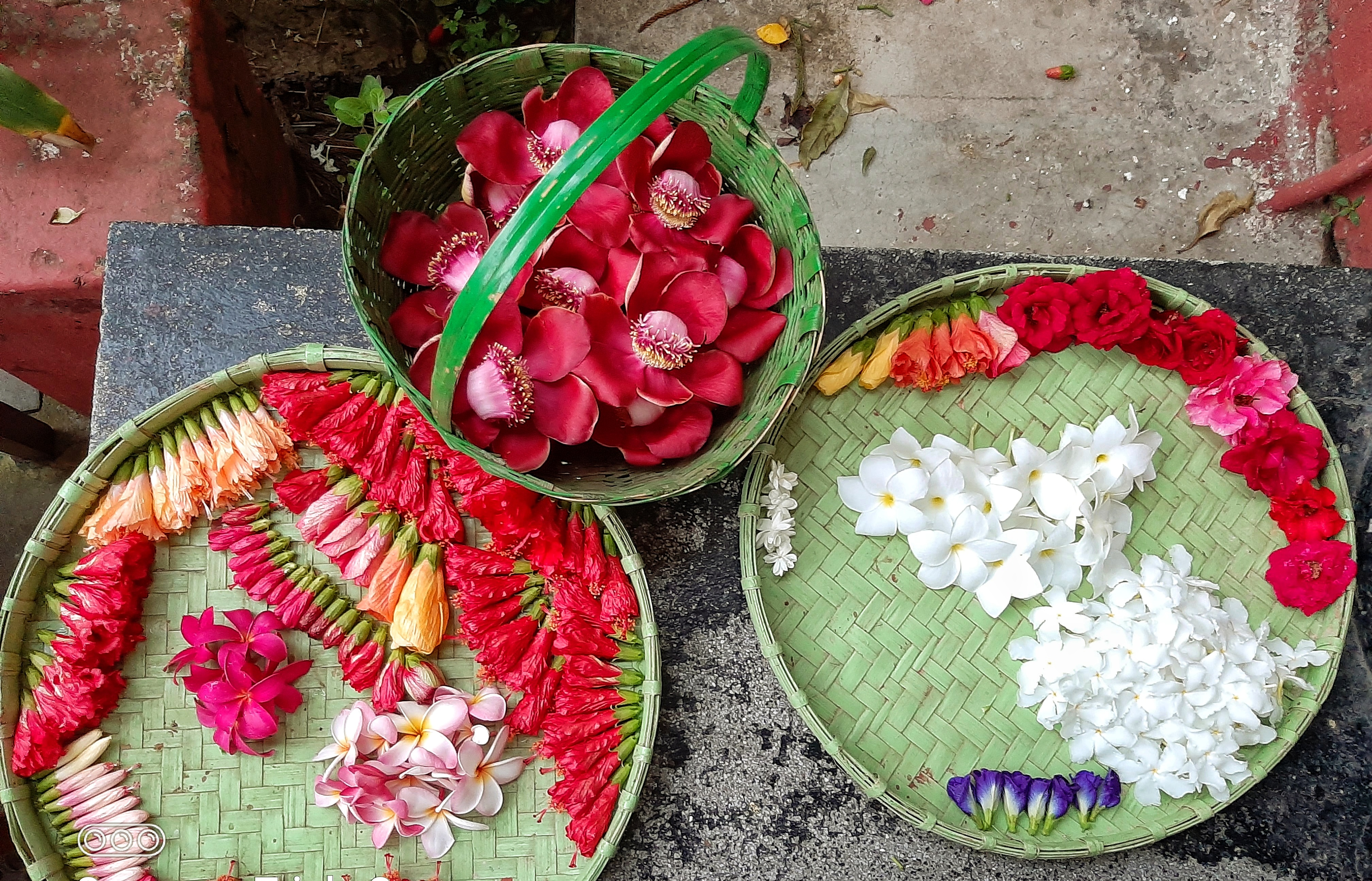
Various flowers, integral part of daily worships in Hinduism.

Substances that are commonly used in Hindu worship include flowers, ghee, incense, kumkum, marigold, milk, sandalwood, tulsi and vibhuti. Among objects used are the altar, banana leaves, bhog, coconuts, diya (oil lamps), fly-whisks, garlands, prasad, shankha (conch) and tilaka.

=== Prasad ===
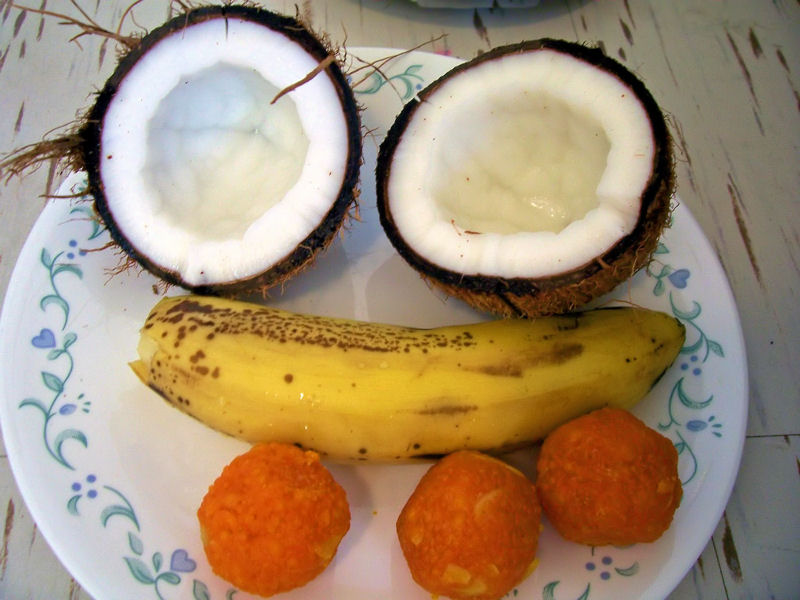
Prasad (bhog)

Prasād is a mental condition of generosity, as well as a material substance that is first offered to a deity and then consumed. Literally, a gracious gift. The prasad has the deity's blessing residing within it. It is believed to have been first tasted by the deity during the ritual offering, symbolizing divine acceptance and blessing. In Bhagavad Gita verse 9.26, Krishna explains that even a small offering with pure heart is accepted by God:

If one offers Me with love and devotion a leaf, a flower, fruit or water, I will accept it.

— Bhagavad Gita, Verse 9.26

In Hindu devotional thought, food placed before a sacred image is believed to be symbolically consumed by the deity with it transforming the offering into prasād which is then shared and eaten by worshippers. In traditions like Vallabha's Puṣṭi-mārga ("pathway of grace"), this exchange is seen as an act of divine grace (puṣṭi). This practice also reshaped earlier ideas of fire sacrifice (yajña). As shown in the Bhagavad-gītā (9.26), even simple, everyday gifts like a leaf, a flower, fruit, or water become sacred offerings when given with a pure heart and devotion (bhakti).

=== Tilaka ===
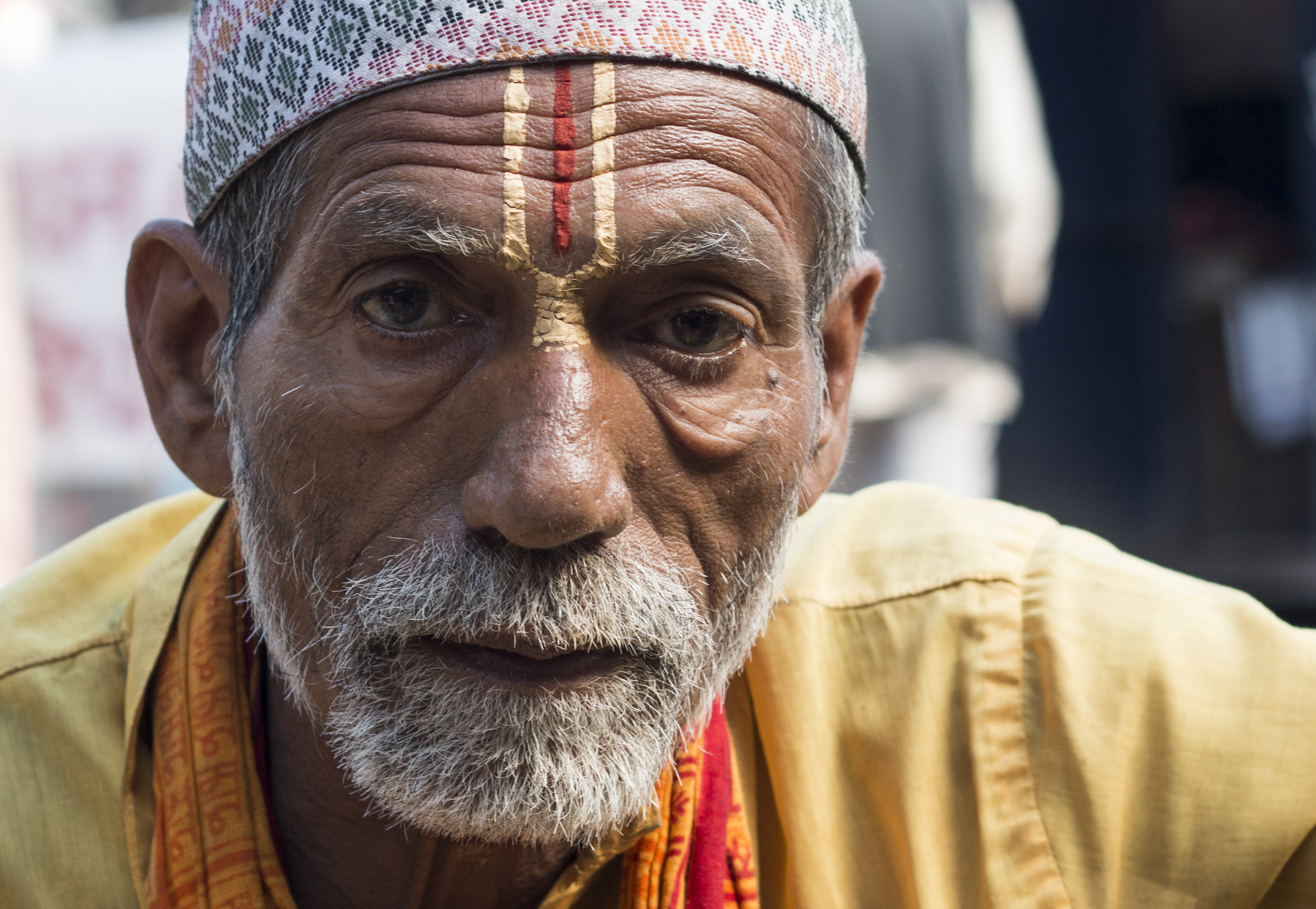
A Hindu man with Shri Vaisnava tilaka marking

The tilaka, tilak or tika is a mark worn on the forehead and in some cases to the upper part of the head. Tilaka may be worn on a daily basis or for special religious occasions only, depending on different customs. The tilaka symbolizes the third eye, or mind's eye, associated with many Hindu gods, and the idea of meditation and spiritual enlightenment. In the past, tilakas were usually worn by gods, priests, ascetics, or worshippers, but is now a common practice for most Hindus. It can express which Hindu tradition one follows. It may be made with sandalwood paste, ashes (vibhuti), kumkum, sindoor, clay, or other substances.

=== Tree worship ===
There are many sacred trees in Hinduism, Peepal, Banyan, Neem, Aamla, Bael. Leaves and fruits of Bael tree are used in worshipping Lord Shiva. The trunks of the neem trees are wrapped in decorative red cloth that has been offered to a goddess, and a brass human mask is added to the tree. Decorative paint is applied to the face, while garlands of marigolds and jasmine flowers are strung around the tree. People worship the neem tree as Shitala for good health and protection from dangerous sicknesses. Tree worshippers tend to gravitate towards one tree in particular that they feel a connection with as an intimate individual.

== Bhajan ==
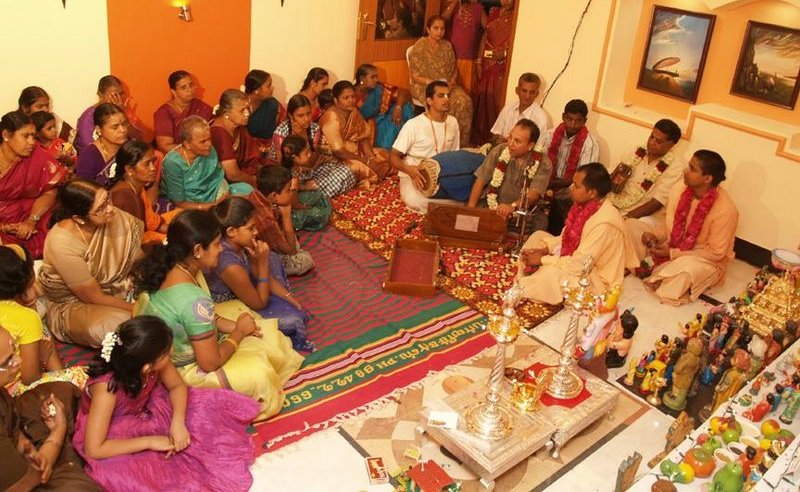
Bhajan in Coimbatore, Tamil Nadu during Navratri Golu

A Bhajan is any type of Indian devotional song. It has no fixed form: it may be as simple as a mantra or kirtan or as sophisticated as the dhrupad or kriti with music based on classical ragas and talas. It is normally lyrical, expressing love for the Divine. The name, a cognate of bhakti, meaning religious devotion, suggests its importance to the bhakti movement that spread from the south of India throughout the entire subcontinent in the Moghul era.

In some Hindu devotional traditions, group singing (bhajana) is an important form of worship through which participants can express shared joy and personal devotion to God. The word comes from the Sanskrit root bhaj, which means to share, serve, or revere, with this highlighting devotion as a mutual relationship between the worshipper and the divine. Devotional music takes lots of forms across different regions, with this ranging from quietly repeating the divine name (nām) to lively group singing (kīrtan and abhaṅg) and structured temple song cycles (Samāj Gāyan). Written by poet-saints in regional languages like Tamil, Hindi, Marathi, Gujarati, Bengali and Kannada, these devotional songs use music and poetry to help worshippers connect with the divine and reflect on sacred stories (līlā).

== Kirtan ==
Kirtan (Sanskrit: "to repeat") is call-and-response chanting or "responsory" performed in India's devotional traditions. A person performing kirtan is known as a kirtankar. Kirtan practice involves chanting hymns or mantras to the accompaniment of instruments such as the harmonium, tablas, the two-headed mrdanga or pakhawaj drum, and karatal hand cymbals.

Different regions have developed their own distinct styles of kīrtan. In Maharashtra, for example poet-saints like Nāmdev and Eknāth used devotional songs (abhaṅg) in kīrtan to praise different forms of the divine. These included incarnations such as Rāma, regarded as an avatar of Vishnu, as well as the formless ultimate reality, which they also called "Rāma". In famous pilgrimage sites in Mathura and Vrindavan, kīrtan helps to bring the surrounding area to life as a sacred place, with this helping participants feel connected to divine stories and take part in the Krishna's sacred play (līlā).

== Mantra ==
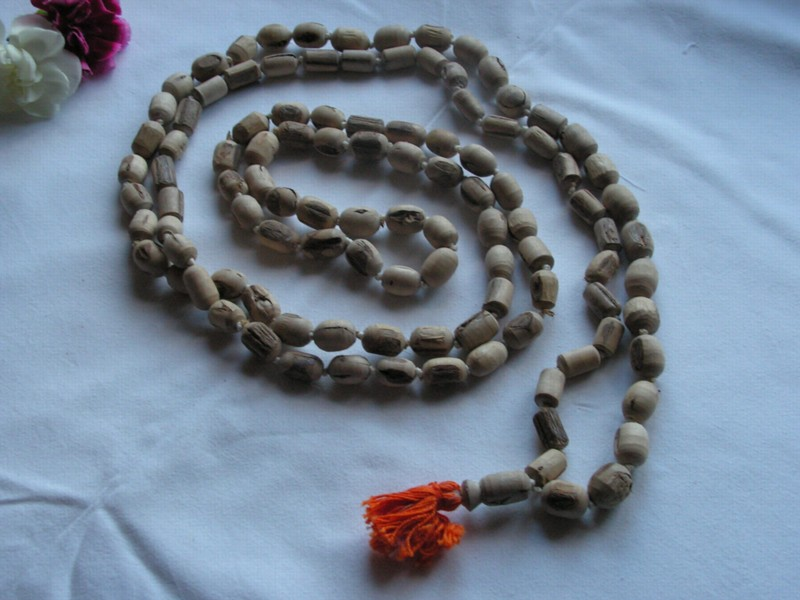
Japa Mala, or Japa beads, consisting of 108 beads plus the head bead

A mantra is a sound, syllable, word, or group of words that is considered capable of "creating transformation" (cf. spiritual transformation). Its use and type varies according to the school and philosophy associated with the mantra. Mantras originated in the Vedic tradition of India. The most basic mantra is Aum, which in Hinduism is known as the "pranava mantra," the source of all mantras.

Mantra japa was a concept of the Vedic sages that incorporates mantras as one of the main forms of puja, or worship, with the ultimate goal being moksha (liberation). Essentially, mantra japa means repetition of mantra, and it has become an established practice of all Hindu traditions. It involves repetition of a mantra over and over again, usually in cycles of auspicious numbers (in multiples of three), the most popular being 108.

== Vrata ==
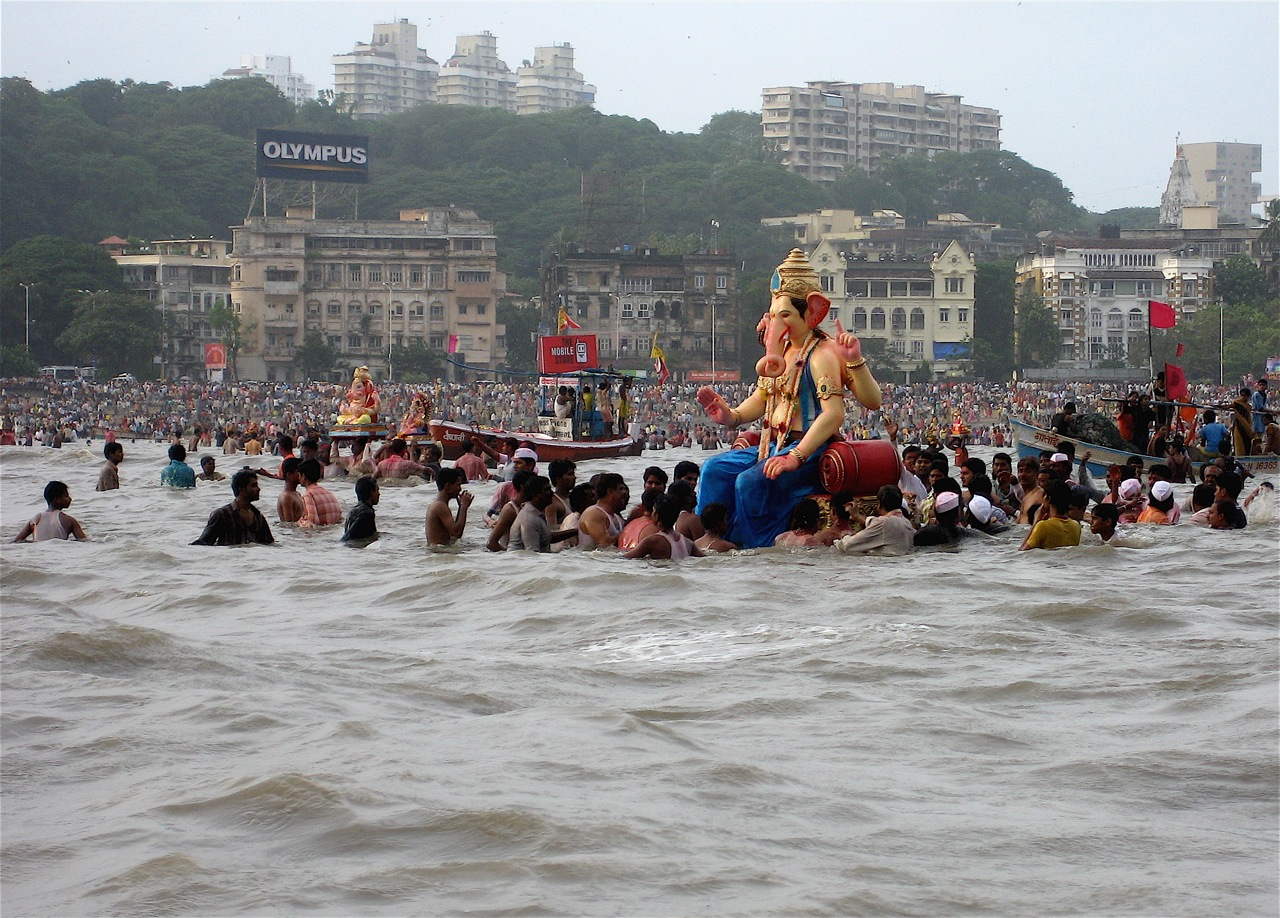
Immersion of Ganesha in Ganesh Chaturthi in Mumbai

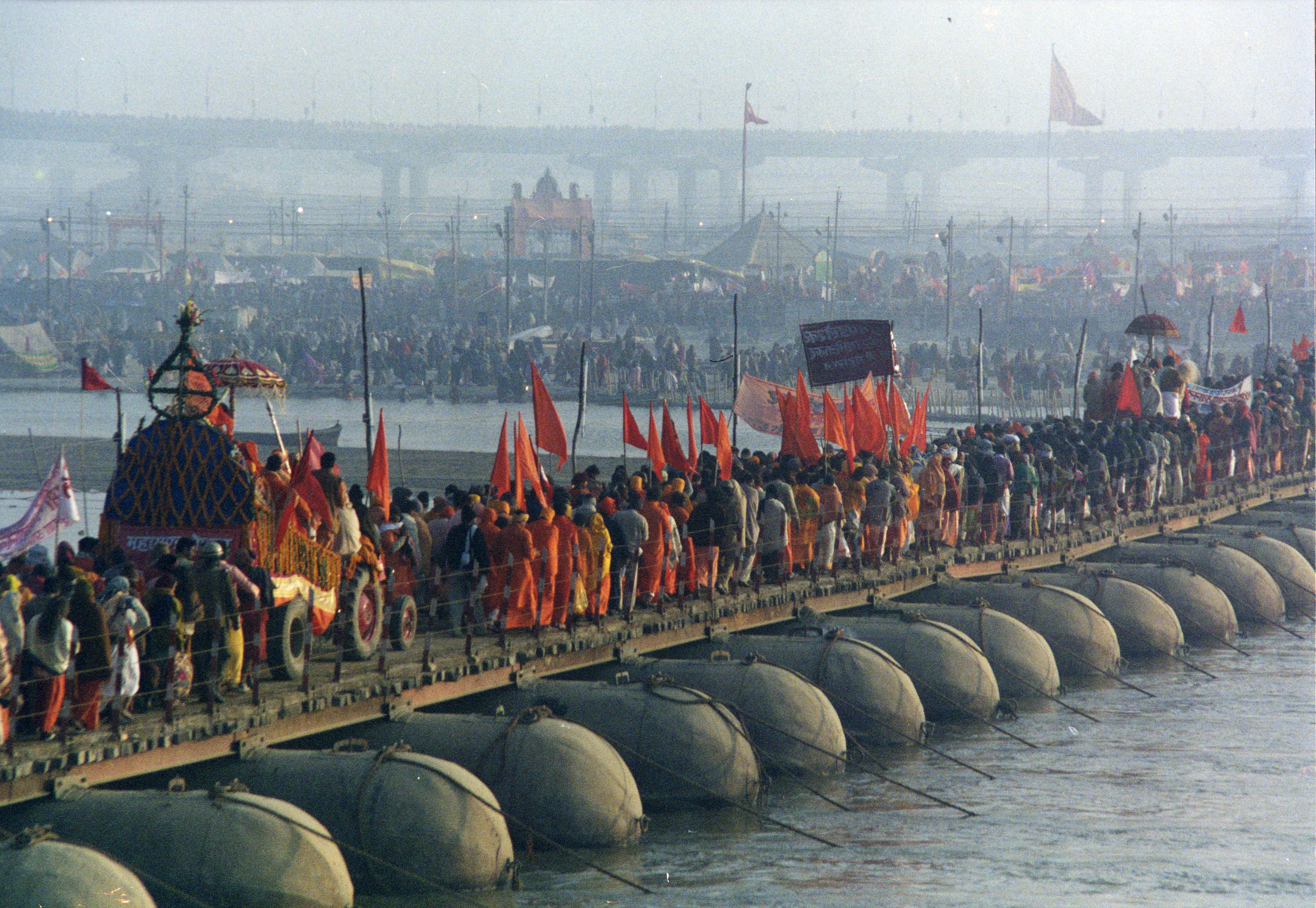
A procession marching over a makeshift bridge over the Ganges river, Kumbh Mela at Allahabad, 2001

In the context of Hinduism, the term vrata (pronunciation: vrat, vratham or brat) denotes a religious practice to carry out certain obligations with a view to achieve divine blessing for fulfillment of one or several desires. Etymologically, vrata, a Sanskrit word (and also used in several Indo-European languages), means to vow or to promise. A vrata may consist of one or more of several actions. Such actions may include complete or partial fasting on certain specific days; a Yatra (pilgrimage) to a particular place or places; a visit, darśana and puja at a particular temple or temples; recitation of mantras and prayers; performing yajnas.

== Festivals ==
Hindus observe sacred occasions by festive observances. All festivals in Hinduism are predominantly religious in character and significance. Many festivals are seasonal. Some celebrate harvest and birth of God or heroes. Many are dedicated to Shiva and Parvati, Vishnu and Lakshmi and Brahma and Saraswati

== Yatra ==
Yātrā ('journey', 'procession') generally means pilgrimage to holy places such as confluences of sacred rivers, places associated with Hindu epics such as the Mahabharata and Ramayana, and other sacred pilgrimage sites. Tīrtha-yātrā refers to a pilgrimage to a holy site, and is generally undertaken in groups. One who goes on a yatra is known as a yatri. A yatra is a kamya ritual; it is desirable, but not obligatory, for a Hindu to perform it. One can go on a yatra for a variety of reasons, including festivals, to perform rituals for one's ancestors, or to obtain good karma. To traditional Hindus, the journey itself is as important as the destination, and the hardships of travel serve as an act of devotion in themselves. Visiting a sacred place is believed by the pilgrim to purify the self and bring one closer to the divine.
