= Puja (Hinduism) =

Prayer ritual in Hinduism

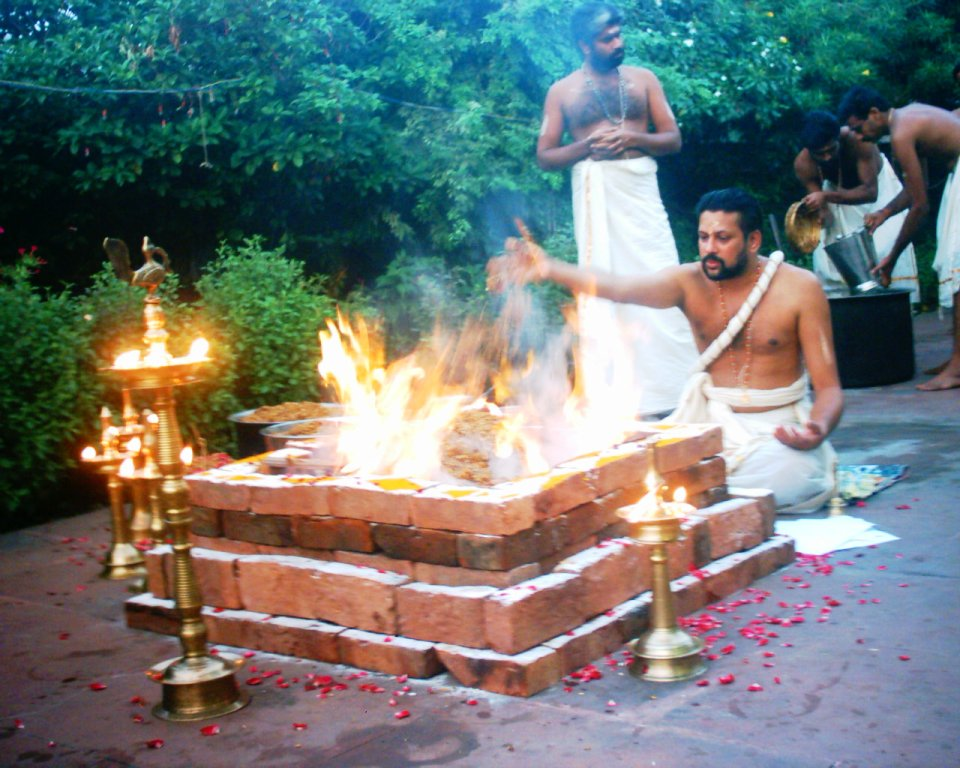
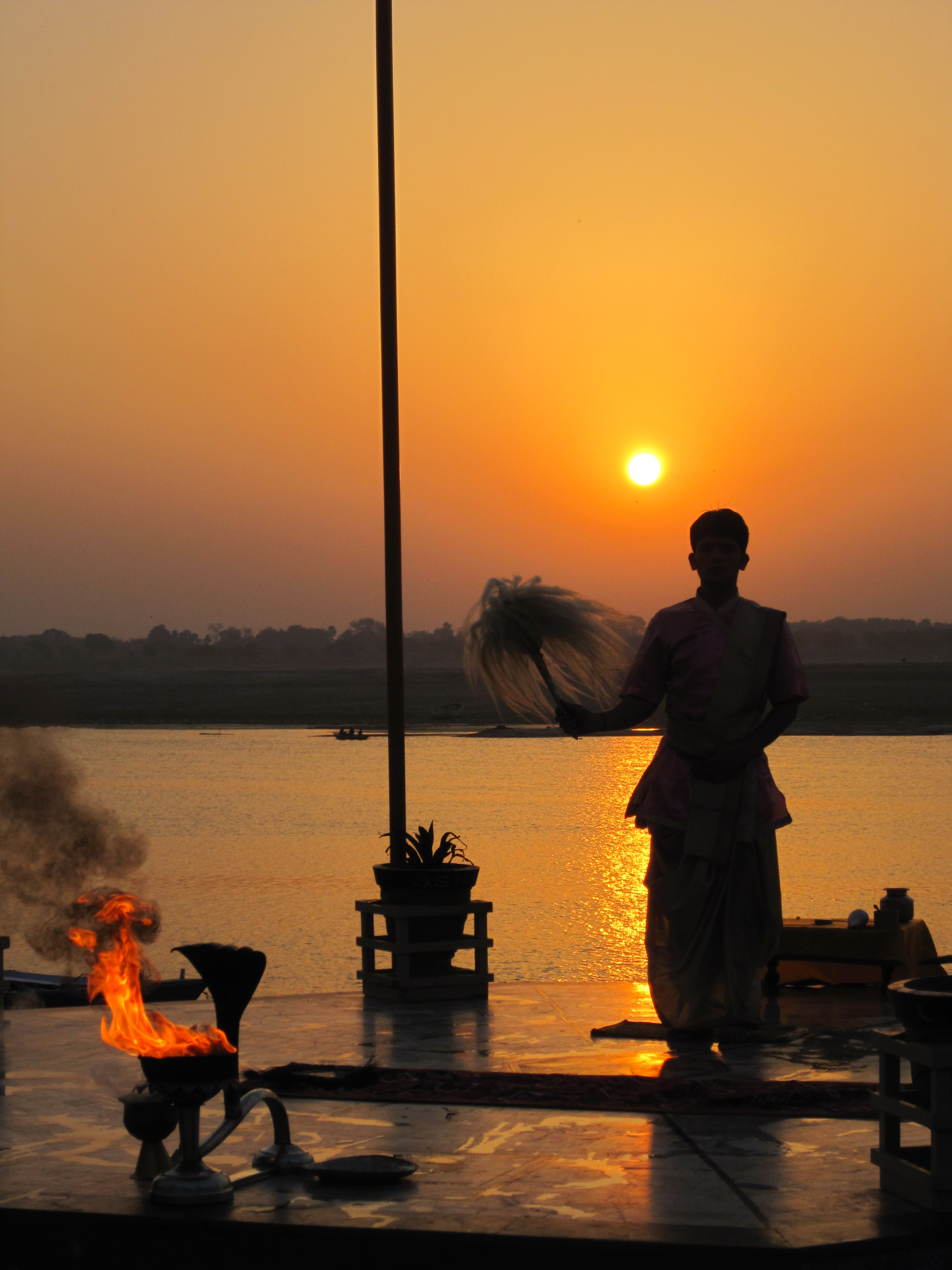
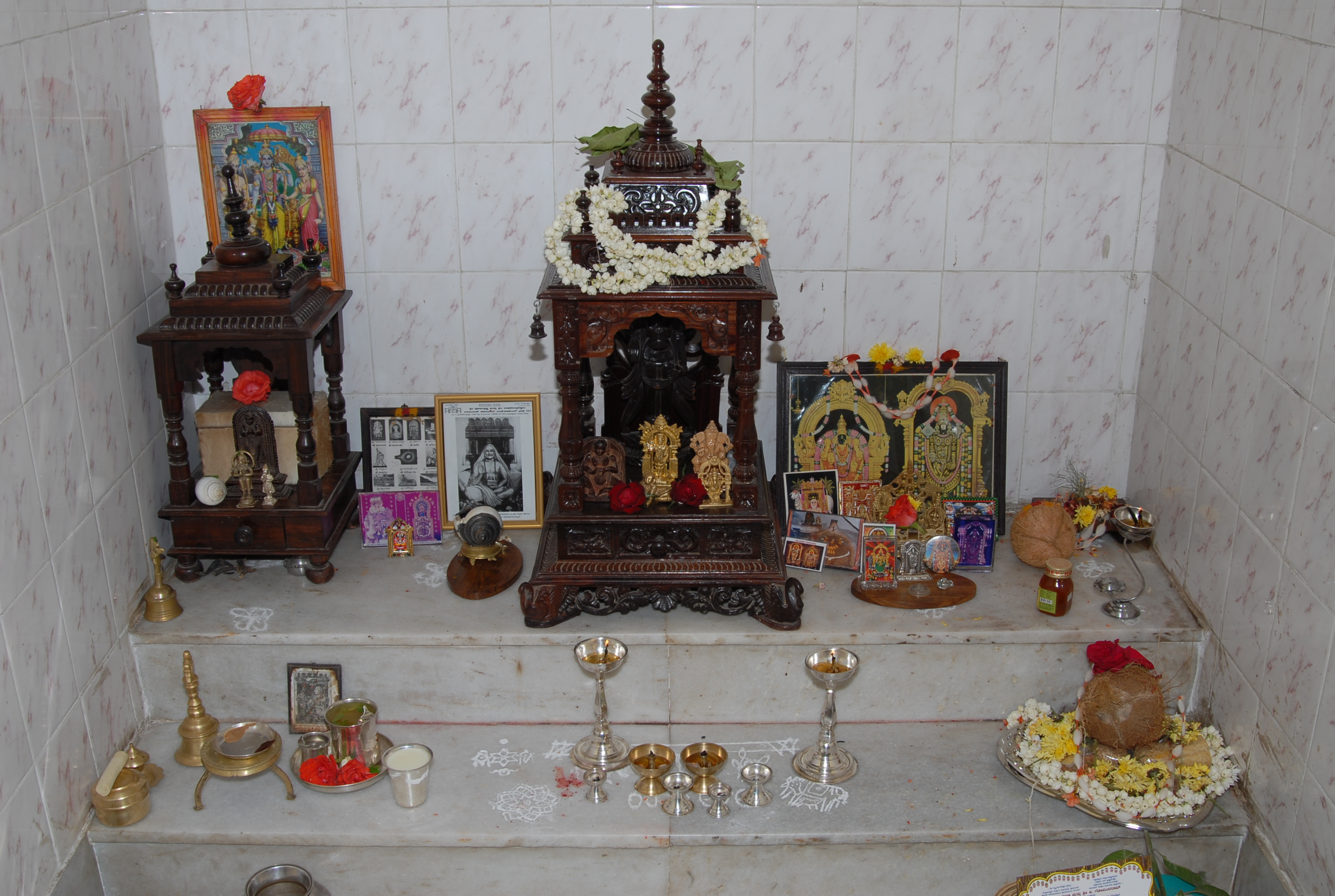
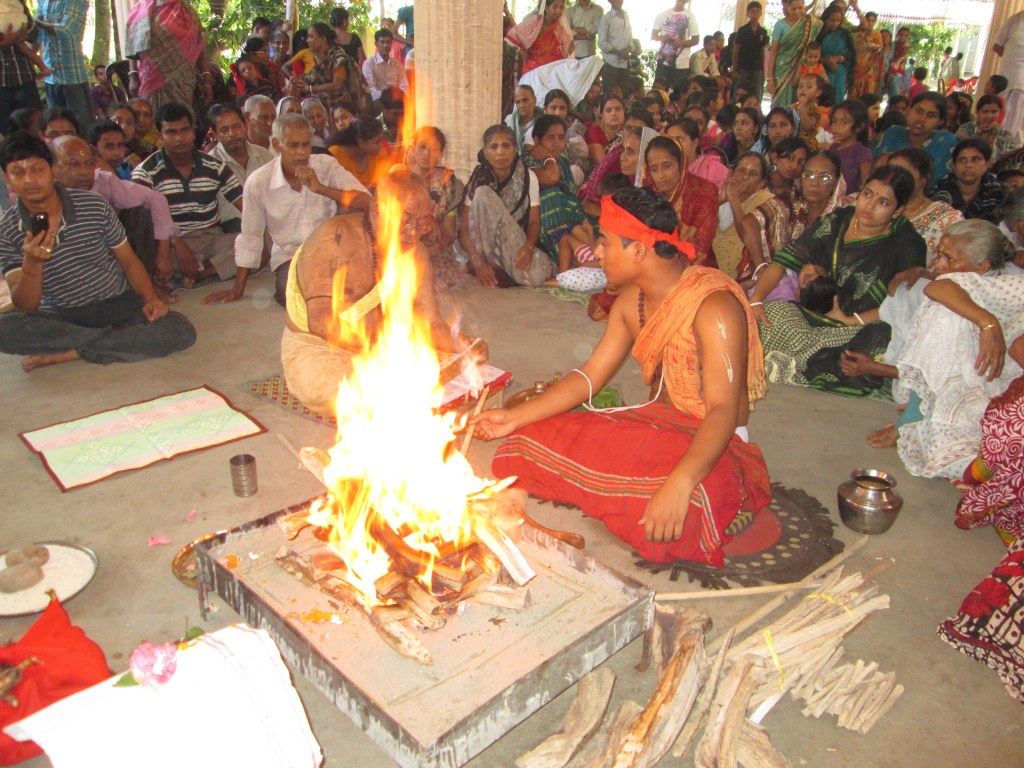
Puja (worship), in different forms. Clockwise from top left: Fire puja, Sunrise puja, Puja rituals at home altar, Yagna puja for goddess Durga.

Puja (Sanskrit: पूजा, romanized: pūjā) is a worship ritual performed by Hindus to offer devotional homage and prayer to one or more deities, to host and honour a guest, or to spiritually celebrate an event. It may honour or celebrate the presence of special guests, or their memories after they die.

The word puja is roughly translated into English as 'reverence, honour, homage, adoration, or worship'. Puja, the loving offering of light, flowers, and water or food to the divine, is a central ritual of Hinduism. For the worshipper, the divine is visible in the image, and the divinity sees the worshipper. The interaction between human and deity, or between human and guru, is called darshanam.

In Hindu practice, puja is performed on a variety of occasions, frequencies, and settings. It may take the form of a daily puja done in the home, or it may be performed in occasional temple ceremonies and annual festivals. In other cases, puja is held to mark events in the course of a worshipper's life, such as: the birth of a baby, a house entering ceremony (grihapravesh), the first rice-eating ceremony (annaprasana), a wedding, a sacred thread ceremony (upanayana) for Brahmins, or a ceremony to begin a new venture (with Ganapathi Puja). The two main areas where puja is performed are in the home or at temples, to mark certain stages of life, and during events or festivals, such as Durga Puja, Kali Puja, Janmashtami, and Lakshmi Puja.

Many Hindu festivals involve puja and other forms of worship. These Hindu festivals include Lakshmi puja during Diwali, worship of Ganesha during Ganesh Chaturthi, prayers and offerings during Janmashtami, and worship of Durga during Navaratri.

For example, a chirathu (also known as a diya), clarified butter wicks, bells, flowers, incense sticks, cones, roli or kumkum (a red powder with turmeric mixed in applied to the forehead), rice, tilakam, chandanam (sandalwood sticks), idols, and samagri havanam are some common items utilized in puja. In Hinduism, puja is a satvik work.

Puja varies according to the sect, region, occasion, deity honored, and steps followed. In formal Nigama ceremonies, a fire may be lit in honor of the god Agni, without an idol or image present. In contrast, in Agama ceremonies, an idol or icon or image of a deity is present. In both ceremonies, a lamp (diya) or incense stick may be lit while a prayer is chanted or a hymn is sung. Puja is typically performed by Hindu worshippers alone, though sometimes in the presence of a priest who is well-versed in complex rituals and hymns. In temples and priest-assisted events puja, food, fruits, and sweets may be included as sacrificial offerings to the ceremony or deity, which, after the prayers, becomes prasadam – food shared by all gathered.

Both Nigama and Agama puja are practised in Hinduism in India. In Balinese Hinduism, agama puja is most commonly performed in homes and temples. Puja is sometimes called Sembahyang in Indonesia.

== Etymology ==
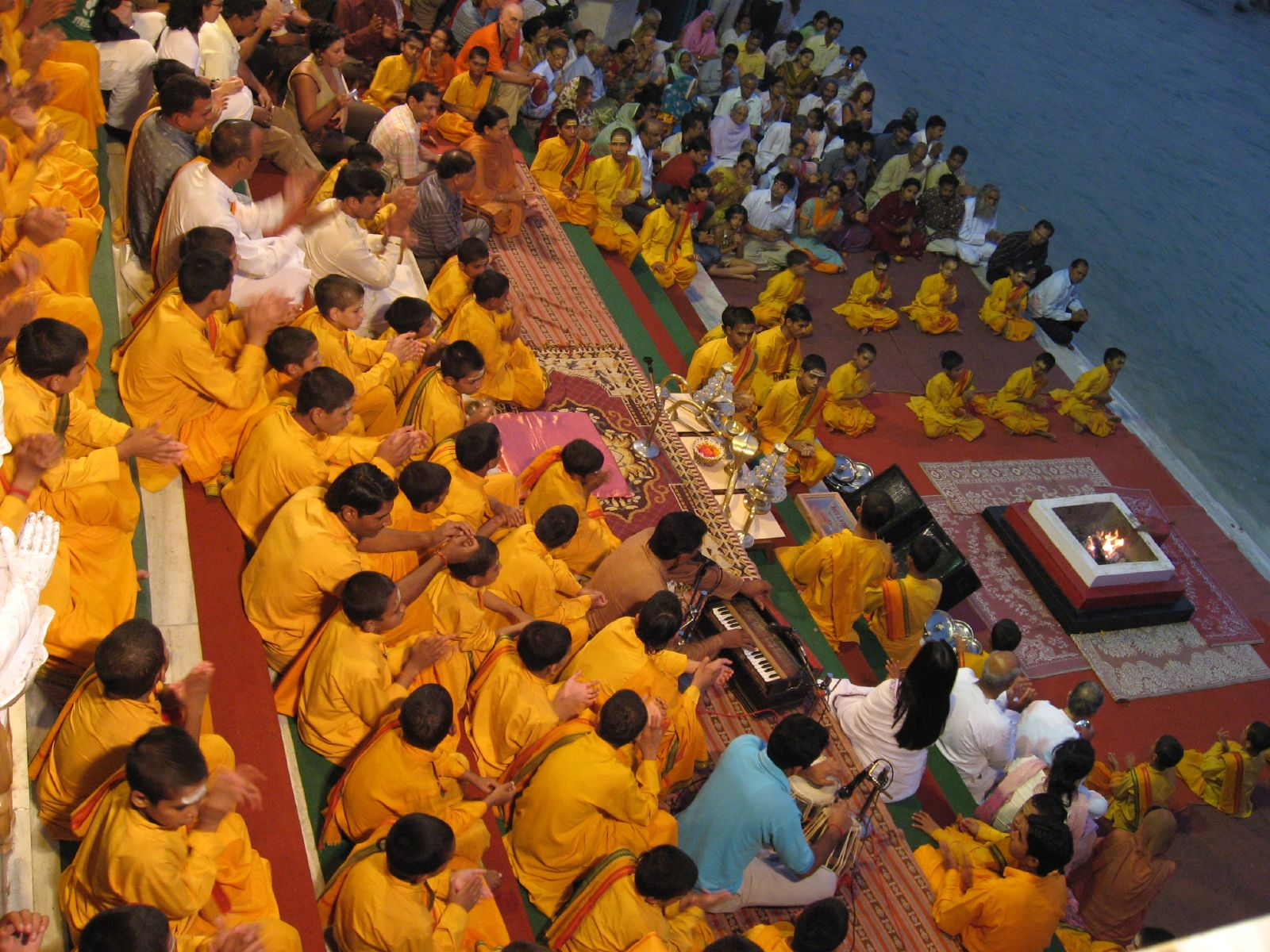
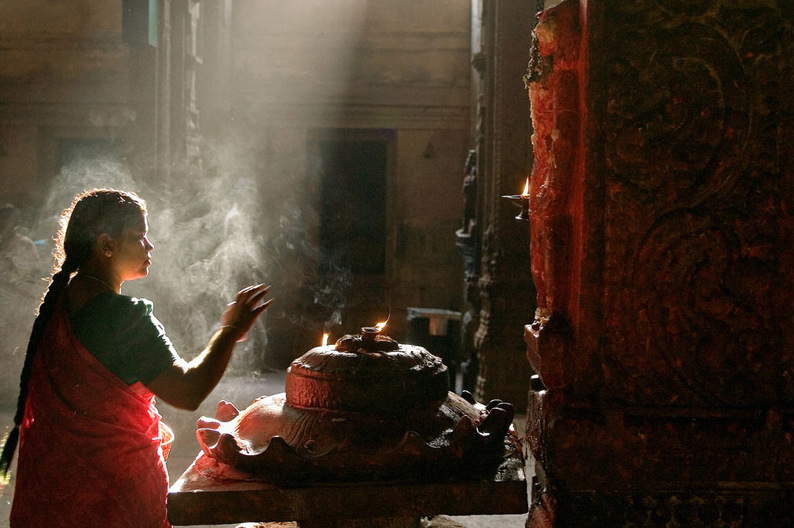
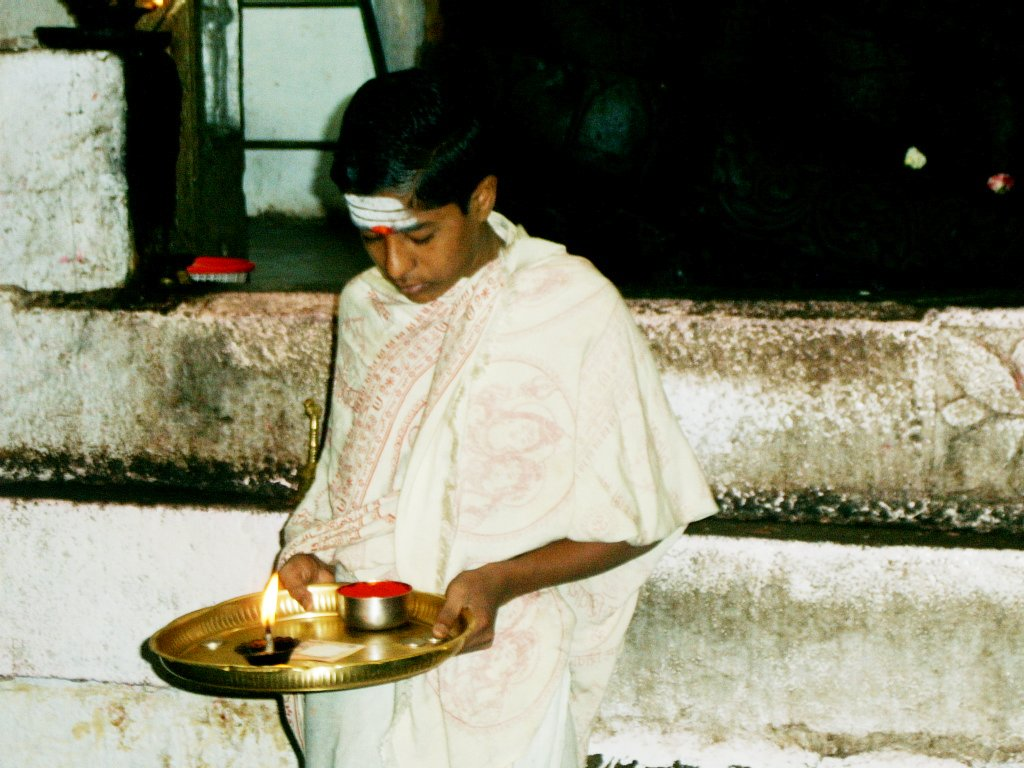
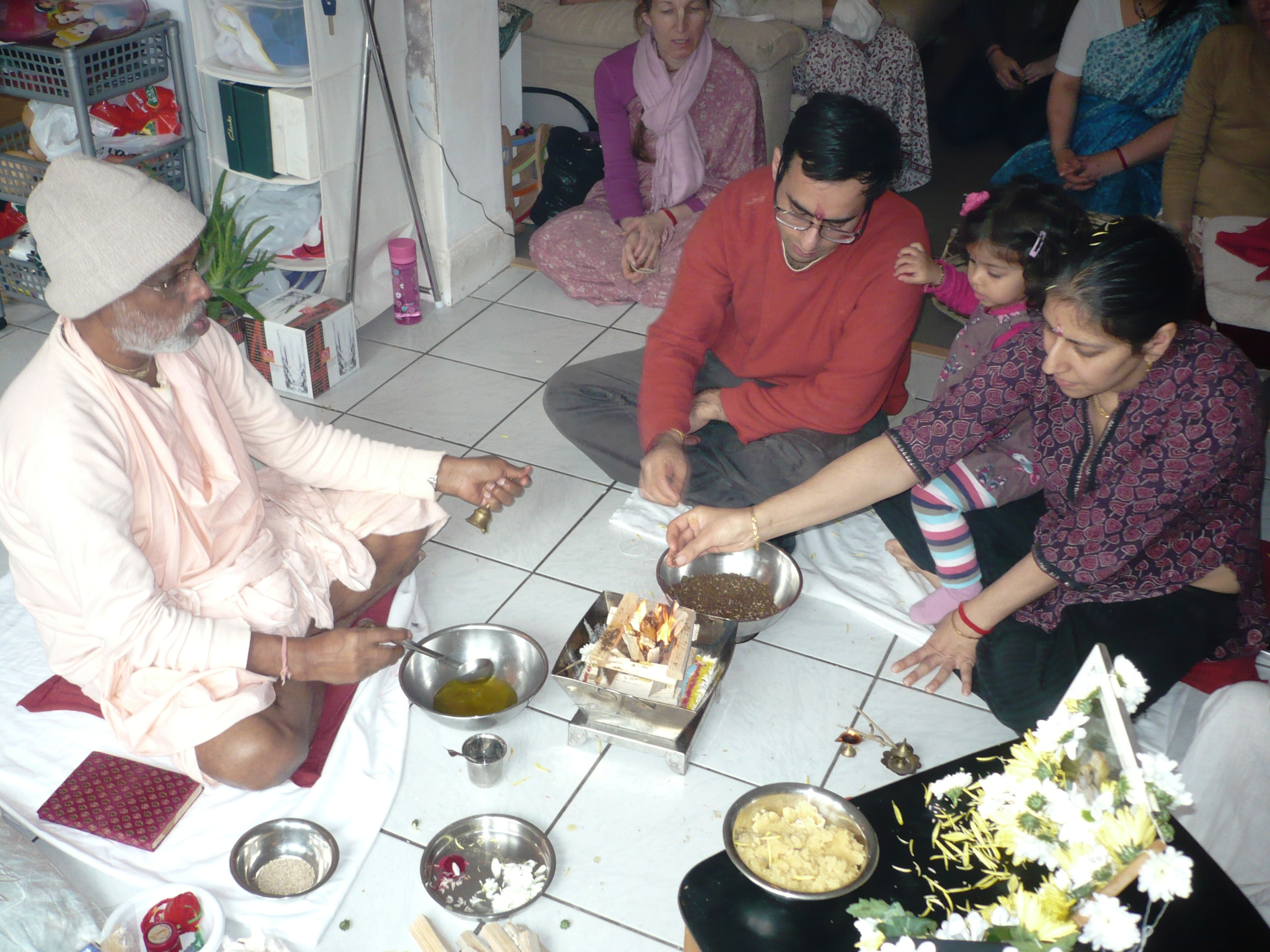
Clockwise from top left: Group puja in North India, a puja in a South Indian temple, a family puja inside a home, Aarati at puja

Puja (पूजा) in Sanskrit means "honour, respect; homage, worship, adoration; hospitable reception." Axel Michaels writes that the etymology of the word is "uncertain". J. A. B. van Buitenen hypothesized that puja evolved from Vedic yajna rituals, but his theory did not gain broad recognition as it only focused on external aspects. The Rigveda in hymn 8.17 uses the word Sachipujanayam (Sanskrit: शाचिपूजनायं) as an epithet for Indra, which alludes to puja in Vedic times. The word puja also appears in the Shatapatha Brahmana, Chandogya Upanishad, and Dharmasutras. The Grhyasutras use puj in the context of rites, as does Sanskrit scholar Pāṇini. However, none of these texts imply puja as a form of devotional prayer worship.

According to Natalia Lidova, puja is unlikely to be of Indo-Aryan and Vedic origin because it lacks a Sanskrit root and it also lacks cognate parallels in other Indo-European languages. Its roots are probably Dravidian in origin, but the evidence for this alternative hypothesis is also largely missing possibly because devotional worship is not as ancient as Hinduism. Collins states that the roots may be "pu" (flower) and "ge" (make), or a form of "making flower sacrifice". However, this proposal is problematic because "pu" comes from an Indo-European root, while "ge" from Dravidian. Like Lidova, Charpentier also suggests the origin of the word puja may lie in the Dravidian languages. Two possible Malayalam roots may be pūSa 'to smear with something' or pūcey "to do with flowers" (from pū 'flower' and cey 'to do'). Tamil roots have also been suggested: pūsai 'to smear with something' or pūcey "to do with flowers" (from pū 'flower' and cey 'to do') or similar Telugu roots pūjēi (from pū 'flower' and cēyi 'to do').

According to the Shiva Purana, puja is derived from cognate of two Sanskrit words puh and jayate, puh meaning 'achievement of fruits of enjoyment' while jayate refers to 'something to be born'. Hence puja refers to the rite by which one attains fruits of enjoyment of things like good ideas and knowledge.

== Origins ==
Scholarly opinion is divided into two main views on the origin of puja. Within the majority view, scholar Timothy Lubin believes that elements of puja were consciously integrated with Vedic rituals.

According to scholars, one of the earliest mentions of pūjā is in the Grihya Sutras, which provide rules for domestic rites. These sutras, dated to about 500 BC, use the term puja to describe the hospitality to honour priests who were invited to one's home to lead rituals for departed ancestors. As with vedic times, the general concept of puja remained the same, but it expanded to welcoming the deity along with the deity's spiritual essence as one's honored guest.

The Puranic corpus of literature, dating from about the 6th century CE, contain an extensive outline on how to perform deity puja (deva pūjā). Deity puja thus melds Vedic rites with devotion to the deity in its ritual form. As with many other aspects of Hinduism, both Vedic puja and devotional deity puja continued, with the choice left to the Hindu.

As a historical practice, pūjā in Hinduism, has been modelled on the idea of hosting a deity, or important person, as an honoured and dearest guest in the best way one can, given one's resources, and receiving their happiness and blessing in return. Paul Thieme suggests that, from passages in the Rāmāyaṇa that the word pūjā referred to the hospitable reception of guests and that the things offered to guests could be offered to the gods and their dwellings. The rituals in question were the "five great sacrifices" or pañcamahāyajña recorded in the Gṛhyasūtra texts (for this literature, see Kalpa). The development of pūjā thus emerged from Vedic domestic traditions and was carried into the temple environment by analogy: just as important guests had long been welcomed in well-to-do homes and offered things that pleased them, so too were the gods welcomed in temple-homes and offered things that pleased them. Copper-plate charters recording grants of land to temples show that this religious practice was actively encouraged from the mid-4th century.

== Significance ==
In the earliest texts describing Vedic puja, the significance of puja was to host the priest so that he could make direct requests to the gods. An example of a petitionary prayer made during a Vedic puja, according to Wade Wheelock, is as follows:

Indra-Agni, slayers of Vrtra with the beautiful thunderbolt, prosper us with new gifts;
O Indra, bring treasures with your right hand;
O Agni grant the enjoyments of a good household;
Give [us] vigour, wealth in cattle, and possession of good horses.
– ÄsvSü

The purpose of the requests is to burn the past karmas to be able to experience oneness with Brahman through the help of the deity. It is a form of bhakti yoga whose final result aims to be the consciousness of god through homage to god. Nevertheless, even with this evolved theoretical spiritual significance, many people use puja as a vehicle to petition for desires and appeals, such as for the good health of one's child, speedy recovery from illness, success in an envisioned venture, or similar goals. In the structure and practice of puja, the mantras and rituals focus on spirituality, and any such petitions and appeals are only added to the end of the puja.

Heinrich Zimmer relates puja to yantras, with the rituals helping the devotee to focus on the spiritual concepts. Puja in Hinduism, writes Zimmer, is a path and process of the transformation of consciousness, where the devotee and the spiritual significance of the deity are brought together. This ritual puja process, in different parts of India, is considered to be liberating, releasing, purifying, and a form of yoga of the spirit and emotions.

Puja in Hinduism sometimes involves themes beyond sacred idols or images (murtis). This may include persons, places, rivers, concrete objects, or anything that is seen as a manifestation of the divine reality by some Hindus. The access to the divine is not limited to renunciatory meditation, as in the Yoga school of Hinduism, or sacred idols, as in Bhakti traditions. For some, the divine is everywhere, without limit to its form, and a puja to these manifestations signifies the same spiritual meaning to those who choose to offer a prayer to persons, places, rivers, concrete objects or anything else.

== Types of Puja ==
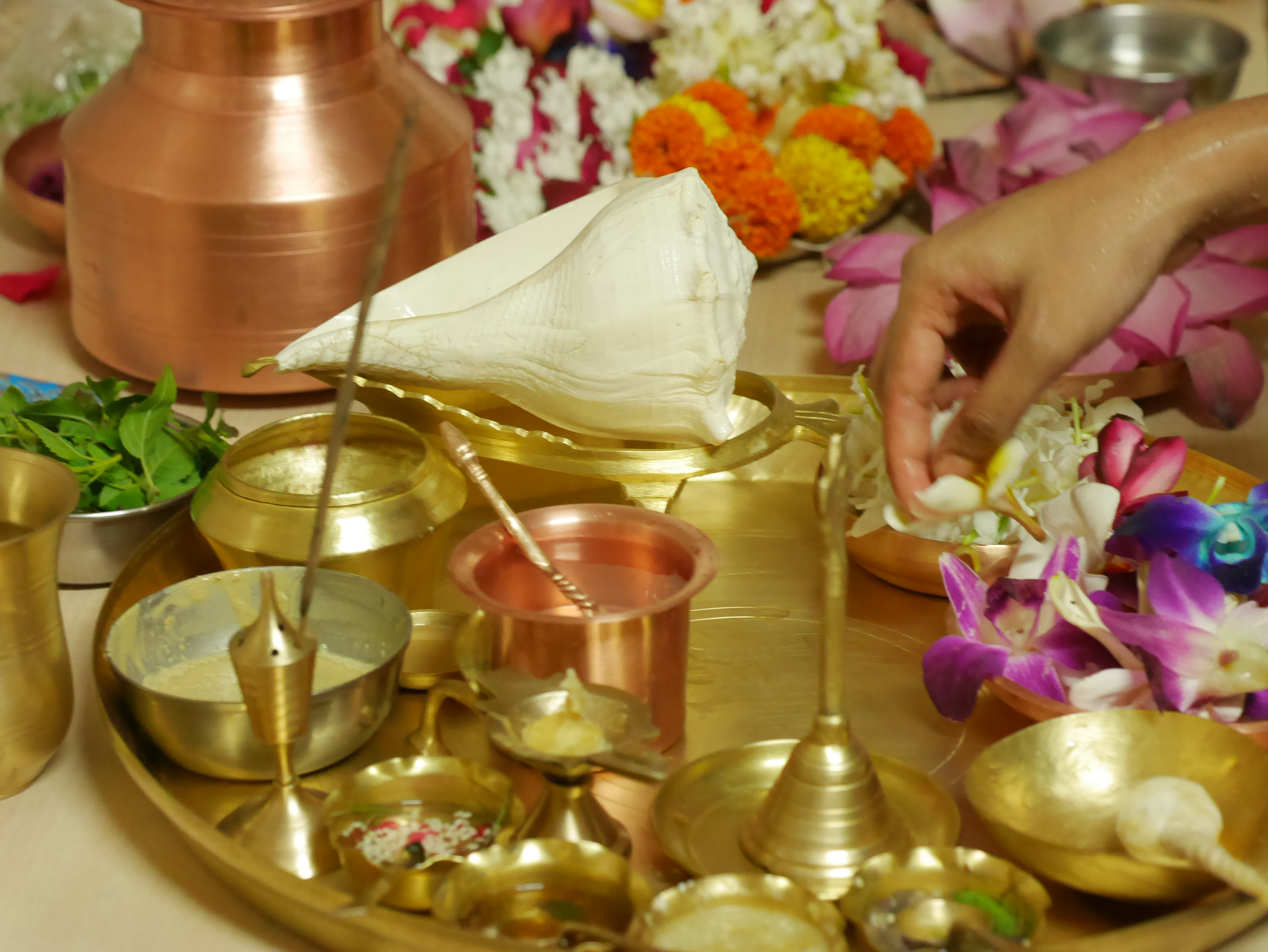
Puja offering tray with various objects used for Upachara rituals during puja.

Pujas can be nitya, obligatory or daily, naimittika, occasional, or kamya, optionally undertaken for a desire.

=== Pancopacara puja ===
A pancopacara, or five-part, puja conventionally involves offering fragrant paste, fresh flowers, incense, a flame, and food to the deity. Once the food has been offered, it is considered blessed, or prasada. It has the same structure as acts people would ordinarily perform for a quick reception, hospitality and affectionate interaction with a beloved guest. First the deity is greeted, acknowledged by name and welcomed, sometimes with a diya or lighted incense stick. The devotee proceeds to connect with the spiritual manifestation by meditating (a form of darshan), or chanting hymns and mantras, then personal prayers follow. After the prayer is finished, the spiritual visitor as the guest is affectionately thanked. A quick meditative puja is sometimes offered by some Hindus without an idol or image. According to Chris Fuller, an anthropologist, Hindu texts allow flexibility and abbreviated puja according to the occasion, needs, and personal preferences.

=== Durga Puja ===
Durga Puja, also known as Durgotsava or Sharodotsav, is an annual festival celebrated in the Indian subcontinent, particularly in Bengal, Assam, and other eastern Indian states as well as in Bangladesh. It honors the Hindu goddess Durga and celebrates her victory over the demon Mahishasura. The festival spans ten days, with the last five being the most significant. During this time, elaborate rituals are performed both in homes and public spaces, including the construction of temporary structures called pandals. Durga Puja features scripture recitations, performances, feasting, gift-giving, and public processions known as melā. It holds great significance in the Shaktism tradition of Hinduism and coincides with Navaratri and Dussehra celebrations observed by other Hindu traditions. The festival celebrates not only the triumph of good over evil but also serves as a harvest festival, honoring Durga as the motherly power behind life and creation. Durga Puja involves the worship of various deities, including Lakshmi, Saraswati, Ganesha, and Kartikeya, alongside Durga. It culminates with the immersion of clay sculptures of the goddess into rivers or water bodies, symbolizing her return to the divine cosmos.

=== Guru puja ===
In the case of great spiritual masters, there is also a custom to perform puja for a living person especially at Guru Purnima. Gurus are sometimes chosen as objects of puja and honoured as living gods or seen as the embodiment of specific deities. Gurus are sometimes adorned with symbolic clothes, garlands and other ornaments, and celebrated with incense, washing and anointing their feet, giving them fruits, food and drink and meditating at their feet, asking for their blessing.

=== Govardhan Puja ===
Govardhan Puja, also known as Annakut or Annakoot, is a Hindu festival celebrated on the first lunar day of the bright fortnight of the month of Kartika, typically falling on the fourth day of Diwali. During this festival, devotees honor Govardhan Hill and express gratitude to Lord Krishna by preparing and offering a diverse array of vegetarian foods.

For followers of Vaishnavism, Govardhan Puja commemorates the episode described in the Bhagavata Purana, in which Lord Krishna lifted Govardhan Hill to shield the villagers of Vrindavan from torrential rainfall. This act symbolizes divine protection and the faith of devotees who wholly rely on God for refuge. To mark this occasion, devotees present a symbolic "mountain of food" representing Govardhan Hill as an offering to God, reaffirming their faith and devotion.

Govardhan Puja is widely observed by various Hindu denominations across India and beyond.

=== Temple pūjā ===
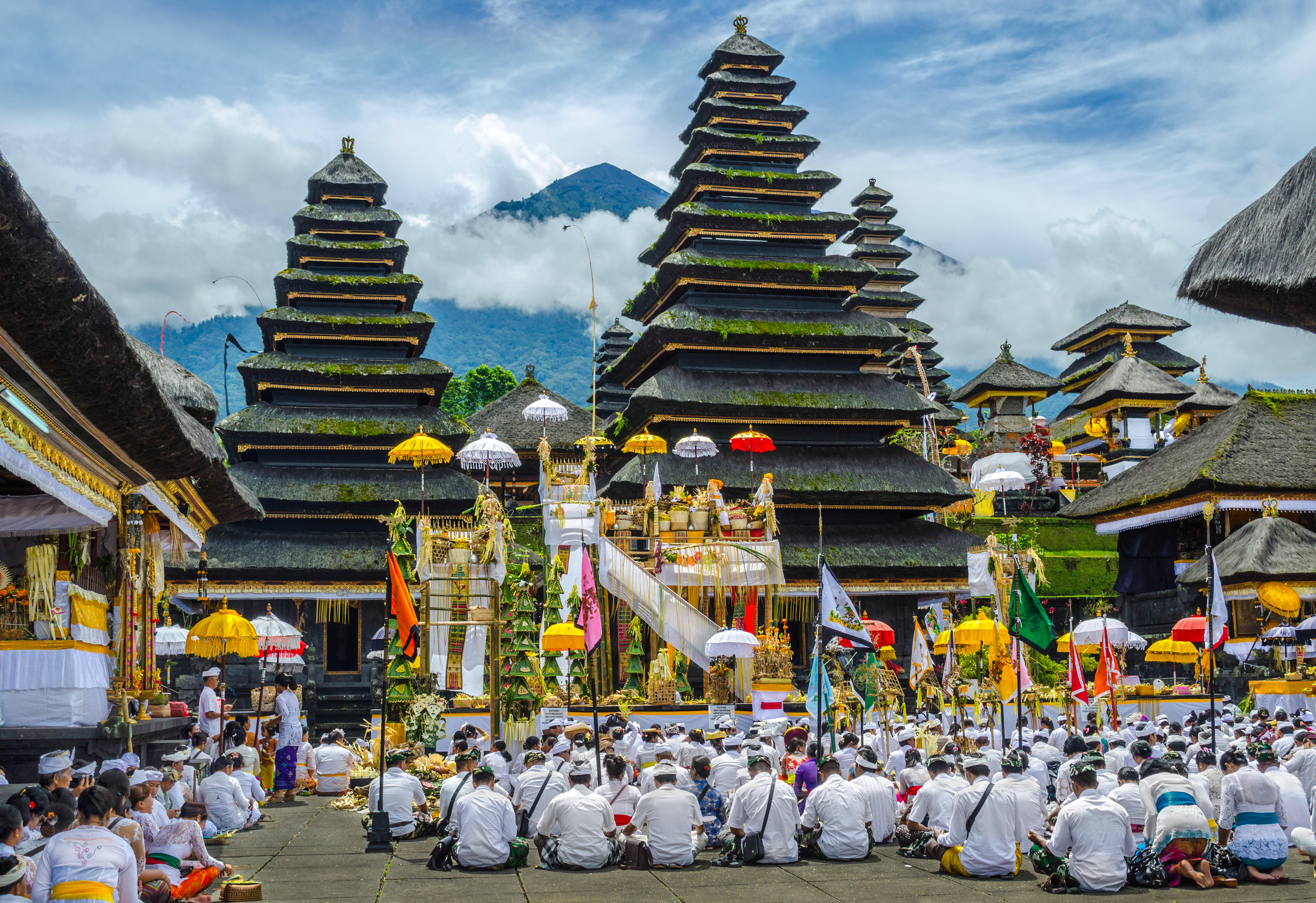
A puja ceremony at Besakih Temple in Bali, Indonesia

Temple (Mandir) pūjā is more elaborate than the domestic versions and typically done several times a day. They are also performed by a temple priest, or pujari. In addition, the temple deity (patron god or goddess) is considered a resident rather than a guest, so the puja is modified to reflect that; for example the deity is "awakened" rather than "invoked" in the morning. Temple pujas vary widely by region and sects, with devotional hymns sung at Vaishnava temples, for example. At a temple puja, there is often less active participation, with the priest acting on behalf of others.

== Puja elements ==
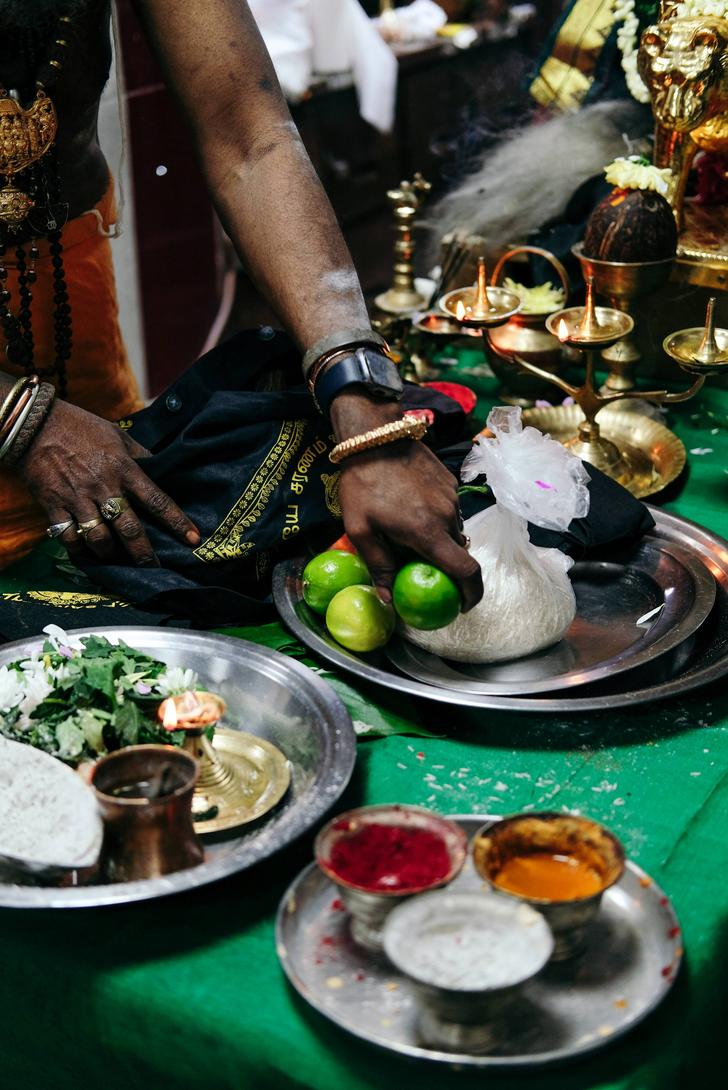
A traditional puja is performed at the Swami Ayyappan Temple in East London, UK.

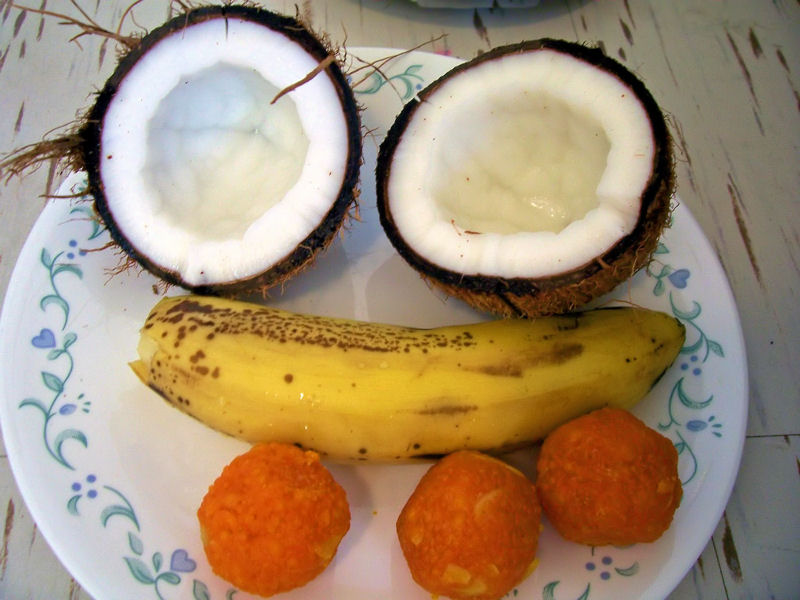
Bhoga (food) to be offered to God for puja

A full home or temple puja can include several traditional upacaras or "attendances". The following is an example puja; these steps may vary according to region, tradition, setting, or time particularly in ways the deity is hosted. In this example, the deity is invited as a guest, the devotee hosts and takes care of the deity as an honored guest, hymns and food are offered to the deity, after an expression of love and respect the host takes leave and with affection expresses good bye to the deity. Indologist Jan Gonda has identified 16 steps (shodasha upachara) that are common in all varieties of puja:

1. Avahana ("invocation"). The deity is invited to the ceremony from the heart. The threshold of the house is washed and decorated with rangoli to welcome the deity.
2. Asana. The deity is offered a seat.
3. Padya. The deity's feet are symbolically washed.
4. Water is offered for washing the head and body
5. Arghya. Water is offered so the deity may wash its mouth.
6. Snana or abhisheka. Water is offered for symbolic bathing.
7. Vastra ("clothing"). Here a cloth may be wrapped around the image and ornaments affixed to it. If a male deity, then a dhoti is draped. If female, a sari is draped.
8. Yajnopavita or Mangalsutra. Putting on the sacred thread (Yajnopavita thread if male and Mangalasutra thread if female).
9. Anulepana or gandha. Perfumes and ointments are applied to the image. Sandalwood paste (chandana paste) or kumkum is applied. If a female deity, turmeric powder, sindoor, kumkum and eye cosmetic (kajjalam aka kaajal) is offered.
10. Pushpam. Flowers are offered before the image, or garlands draped around its neck.
11. Dhupa. Incense is burned before the image.
12. Aarathi. A burning lamp is waved in front of the image. Usually, the aarti flame is burned using camphor or ghee-soaked wicks as Maha-neeraajanam.
13. Naivedya. Foods such as cooked rice, fruit, clarified butter, sugar, and betel leaf are offered.
14. Taamboola. Betel nut, betel leaves, rice grains, turmeric pieces and money are offered.
15. Namaskara or pranama. The worshipper and family bow or prostrate themselves before the image to offer homage.
16. Parikrama or Pradakshina. Circumambulation around the deity.
17. Taking leave.

Sometimes additional steps are included:

1. Dhyanam ("Meditation"). The deity is invoked in the heart of the devotee.
2. Achamaneeyam. Water is offered for sipping.
3. Aabharanam. The deity is decorated with necklaces and jewels.
4. Chatram. Offering of ceremonial umbrella.
5. Chamaram Offering of fan or fly-whisk (Chamara) to provide air-conditioning to the deity.
6. Visarjana or Udvasana. The deity is moved from the place.

There are variations in this puja method such as:

1. Pancha upachara puja (puja with five steps).
2. Chatushasti upachara puja (puja with 64 steps).

The structure of elaborate puja also varies significantly between temples, regions, and occasions.

Archana puja is a brief intercessionary puja on behalf of an individual that can be undertaken after the main puja.

== In Balinese Hinduism ==
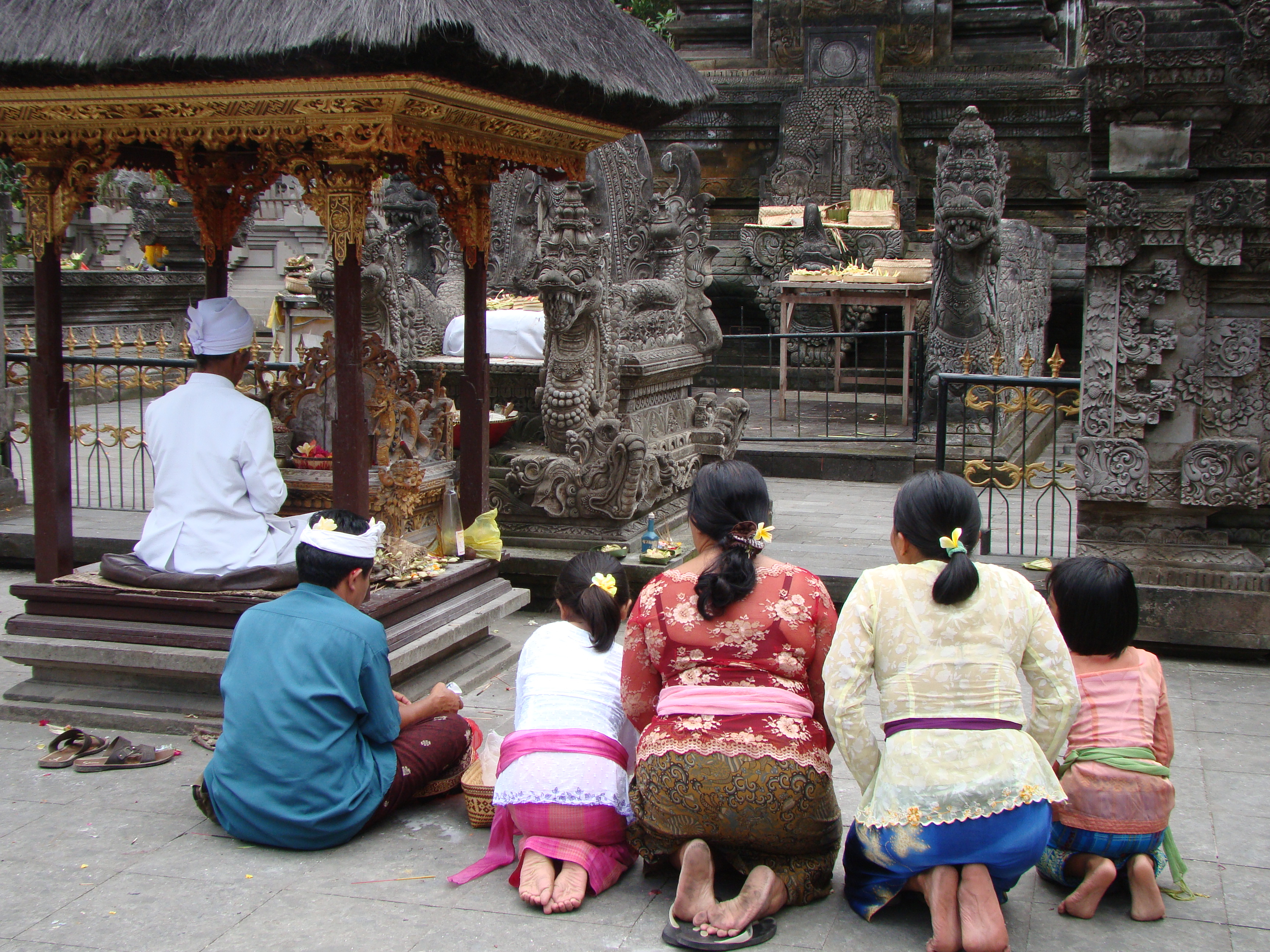
Balinese family offers puja at a Hindu Temple, Bali, Indonesia.

In Hinduism of Bali Indonesia, puja is sometimes called Sembahyang. The word originates from two words in old Javanese: sembah and hyang. Sembah means to respect and bow down; Hyang means divine, God or Sang Hyang Widhi Wasa, holy man, and ancestors. So to pray means to respect, bow down, surrender to the divine and ancestors.

Sembahyang (puja) is an obligation for Balinese Hindus, the prayers and hymns are derived from the Vedas. A family typically offers prayers every day, with Kewangen and other offerings. Kewangen means aromatic, and it is made from leaves and flowers in form of auspicious Vedic symbols. Balinese use kewangen to worship the divine, both in form of Purusha (soul) and Pradana (body). As with India, Balinese make offerings, including symbolic inclusion of fire, incense and mantras.

== As a social and human rights event ==
Pūjā in Hinduism has served as a means for Hindu communities outside India to gather, socialize, discover new friends and sometimes discuss ways to address social discrimination of Hindus. For example, Marion O'Callaghan reports that the Hindu diaspora brought as indentured laborers to Trinidad by the British colonial government, suffered discriminatory laws that did not recognize traditional Hindu marriages or inheritance rights of children from a traditional Hindu marriage, nor did the non-Hindu majority government allow pyre cremation or construction of crematorium. These Hindu rituals were considered pagan and uncivilized. Pujas offered a way for Hindus to meet, socially organize and petition their human rights. Over time, pujas became as much a social and community recreational event as a religious event.

== Critique of pūjā in the Pūrva Mīmāṃsaka school ==
Although pujā is accepted as a valid religious activity by Hindus at large, it has long been criticised by Mīmāṃsā thinkers. The foundational work of this school was the Karmamīmāṃsāsūtra or "Aphorisms for Enquiry into the Act," composed by Jaimini. The earliest surviving commentary was by Śabara who lived around the end of the fourth century. Śabara's commentary, known as Śabarabhāṣya held pride of place in Mīmāṃsā in that Sabara's understanding was taken as definitive by all later writers.

In his chapter entitled Devatādikaraṇa (9: 1: 5: 6–9), Śabara examined the popular understanding of the gods and attempted to refute the belief that they have material bodies, are able to eat the offerings made to them, and are capable of being pleased and so able to reward worshippers. Basing himself on the Vedas (he refused to accept the Mahābhārata, Purāṇa texts or even the Smṛti literatures as valid sources of authority), Śabara concluded that the gods are neither corporeal nor sentient and thus unable to enjoy offerings or own property. For this he appealed to empirical observation, noting that offerings do not decrease in size when given to the gods; any decrease is simply due to exposure to the air. Likewise he argued that substances are offered to gods not according to the wishes of the gods, but that "what is vouched for by direct perception is that the things are used according to the wishes of the temple servants (pratyakṣāt pramāṇāt devatāparicārakāṇām abhiprāyaḥ).

In the course of his discussion, Śabara's asserted that "there is no relation between the case of guests and the sacrificial act." This incidental remark provided sound historical proof that pūjā was built on analogy with atithi, the ancient Vedic tradition of welcoming guests. What Śabara was maintaining was that this analogy was not valid.

While the Mīmāṃsakas continued to maintain this interpretation for centuries, their defeat in debate at the hands of Śaṅkarācārya led to theirs being a minority view. Mīmāṃsakas flourished even into the 17th century, as evidenced by the commentaries of Nīlakaṇṭha.

== See also ==
* List of materials used in Hinduism
- Pūjā (Buddhism)
- Sacred food as offering
- Satyanarayana Puja
- The Archaeology of Hindu Ritual
- Worship in Hinduism
