= List of materials used in Hinduism =

This is a list of materials with religious significance in Hinduism. For more information, see the linked articles.

== List of materials ==
- Agarwood or oud, resinous heartwood of certain trees, is mentioned in the Vedas. It is valued in many cultures for its distinctive fragrance.
- Alta or Mahawar is a red dye which women in (North) India apply with cotton on the border of their feet during marriages and religious festivals.
- Camphor, an aromatic solid, is widely used in Hindu religious ceremonies, burned to make a holy flame.
- Charu is the name of a sweet porridge-like foodstuff used as an offering in Yajnas.
- Ghee, clarified butter made from cow's milk, is a sacred requirement in Vedic yajña and homa (fire sacrifices).
- Incense is also mentioned in the Vedas. Incense is burned both to create pleasing aromas and a medicinal tool, which is considered the first phase of Ayurveda and was assimilated into the religious practices of early Hinduism.
- Kumkuma is a powder made from turmeric or saffron, used for social and religious markings in Hinduism.
- Marigold flowers are very significant in Nepalese culture, for daily rituals and especially during the Tihar festival. Garlands are also used in India as decorations for weddings, festivals and religious events.
- Panchagavya is a concoction of cow dung, urine, milk, curd and ghee, used as a fertiser as well as in Hindu rituals and Ayurvedic medicine.
- Rudraksha is a tree whose seed is traditionally used for prayer beads in Hinduism.
- Sandalwood paste is used in Hindu rituals and ceremonies to mark religious utensils, decorate icons of deities, and applied by devotees to the forehead or the neck and chest.
- Sindoor is a red cosmetic powder, worn by women in many Hindu communities along the parting of their hair (maang) to denote that they are married, or as a dot on the forehead (bindi).
- Soma was a Vedic ritual drink of importance among the early Indo-Iranians, frequently mentioned in the Rigveda.
- Tulasi or holy basil is an aromatic plant whose leaves are used in the worship of Vishnu and Lakshmi.
- Turmeric is a plant of the ginger family, considered highly auspicious throughout India. Its flower, root and powder are used extensively in weddings and religious ceremonies.
- Vibhuti is the sacred ash used in Vedic rituals. Hindu devotees make a paste with water and apply it across the forehead and other parts of the body.

== See also ==
- Incense in India
- Panchagavya
- Panchamrita
- Prasada
- Sacred food as offering
- Food and drink prohibitions
