= Haldi Kumkum =

Indian social ceremony

Haldi Kumkum, or the Haldi Kumkum ceremony, is a social gathering in India in which married women exchange haldi (turmeric) and kumkum (vermilion powder), as a symbol of their married status and wishing for their husbands' long lives.

The ceremony is particularly popular in the Deccan Indian states of Maharashtra, Karnataka, Telangana, Andhra Pradesh, Goa. In Tamil Nadu, it is celebrated as Aadi perukku aka Aadi monsoon festival is a Hindu Tamil festival celebrated on the 18th day of the Tamil month of Adi (mid-July to mid-August). Married women invite friends, relatives, and new acquaintances to meet in an atmosphere of merriment and fun. On such occasions, the hostess distributes bangles, sweets, small novelties, flowers, betel leaves and nuts as well as coconuts. The snacks include Kairiche Panhe (raw mango juice) and Vatli Dal.

This ceremony is conducted on different occasions like on Fridays during the month of Shravana, Diwali, and Sankranti.

Magahi Haldi folk song

== See also ==
- Marathi people
