= Prasada =

Religious food offered in Hinduism and Sikhism temples

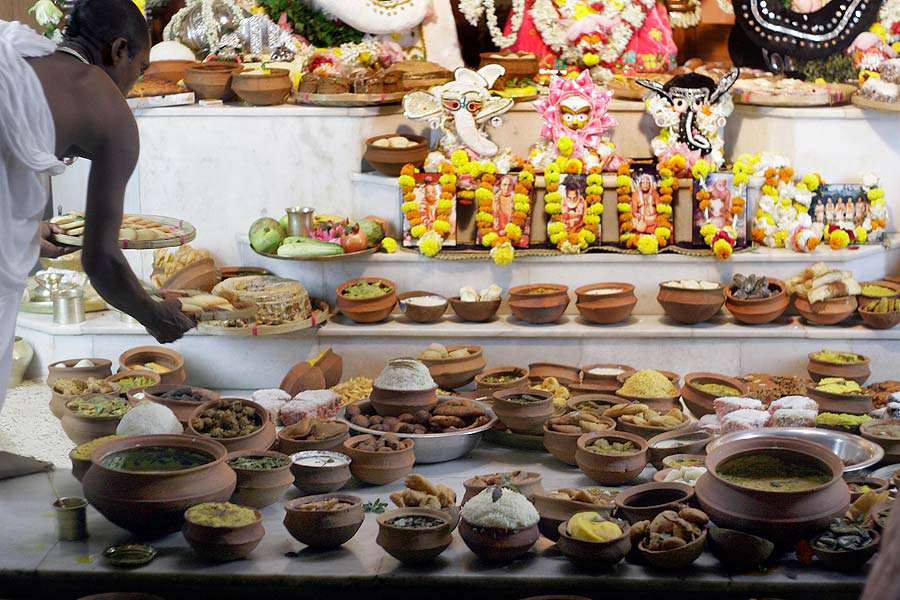
Naivedya offered to Radha Krishna in Sri Maya Chandrodaya Mandir in Mayapur, India

Prasāda (Sanskrit pronunciation: [pɽɐsaːdɐ], Sanskrit: प्रसाद), prasad or prasadam is a religious offering in Hinduism. Most often prasada is vegetarian food especially cooked for devotees after praise and thanksgiving to a god. Mahaprasada (also called bhandarā), is the consecrated food offered to the deity in a Hindu temple which is then distributed and partaken by all the devotees regardless of any orientation.

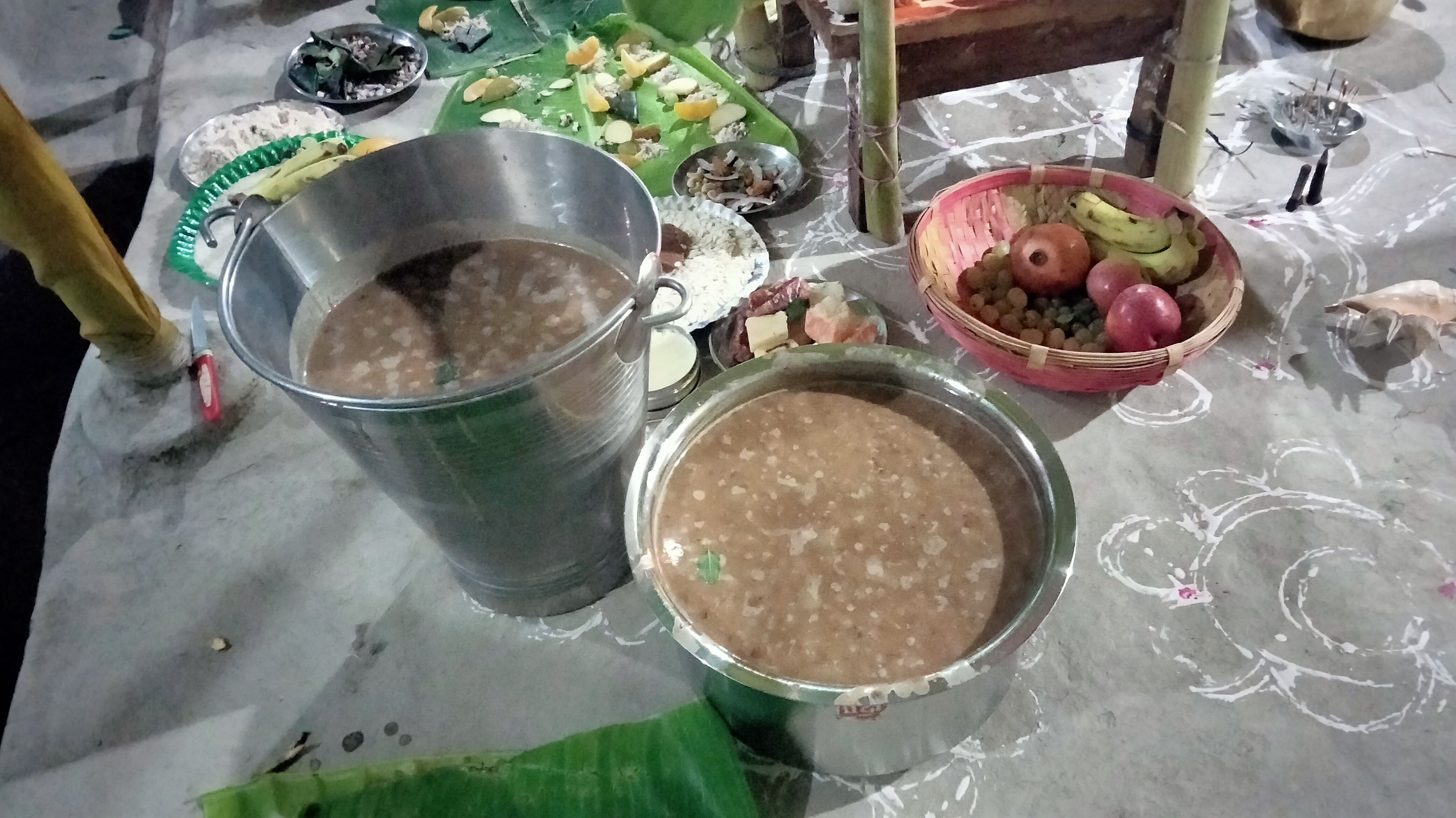
View of Prasad for Satyanarayana Puja by Maithils at Basuki Bihari village in the Mithila region.

Prasada is closely linked to the term naivedya, also spelt naivedhya, naibedya or naived(h)yam. The food offered to the deity is called naivedya, while the sacred food sanctified and returned by the deity as a blessing is called prasada.

In Sikhism, the tradition takes the form of Karah Parshad.

== Etymology ==
Prasāda is derived from the verb prasād which consists of the verb सद् (sad - to sit, dwell) which is prefixed with प्र (pra - before, afore, in front) and used as finite verb प्रसीदति (prasīdati - dwells, presides, pleases or favours etc.). It denotes anything, typically food, that is first offered to a deity or saint and then distributed in His or Her name to their followers or others as a good sign.

'Prasāda' is sometimes translated as gift or grace. The term connotes clarity, joy, and serenity.

== Practices ==
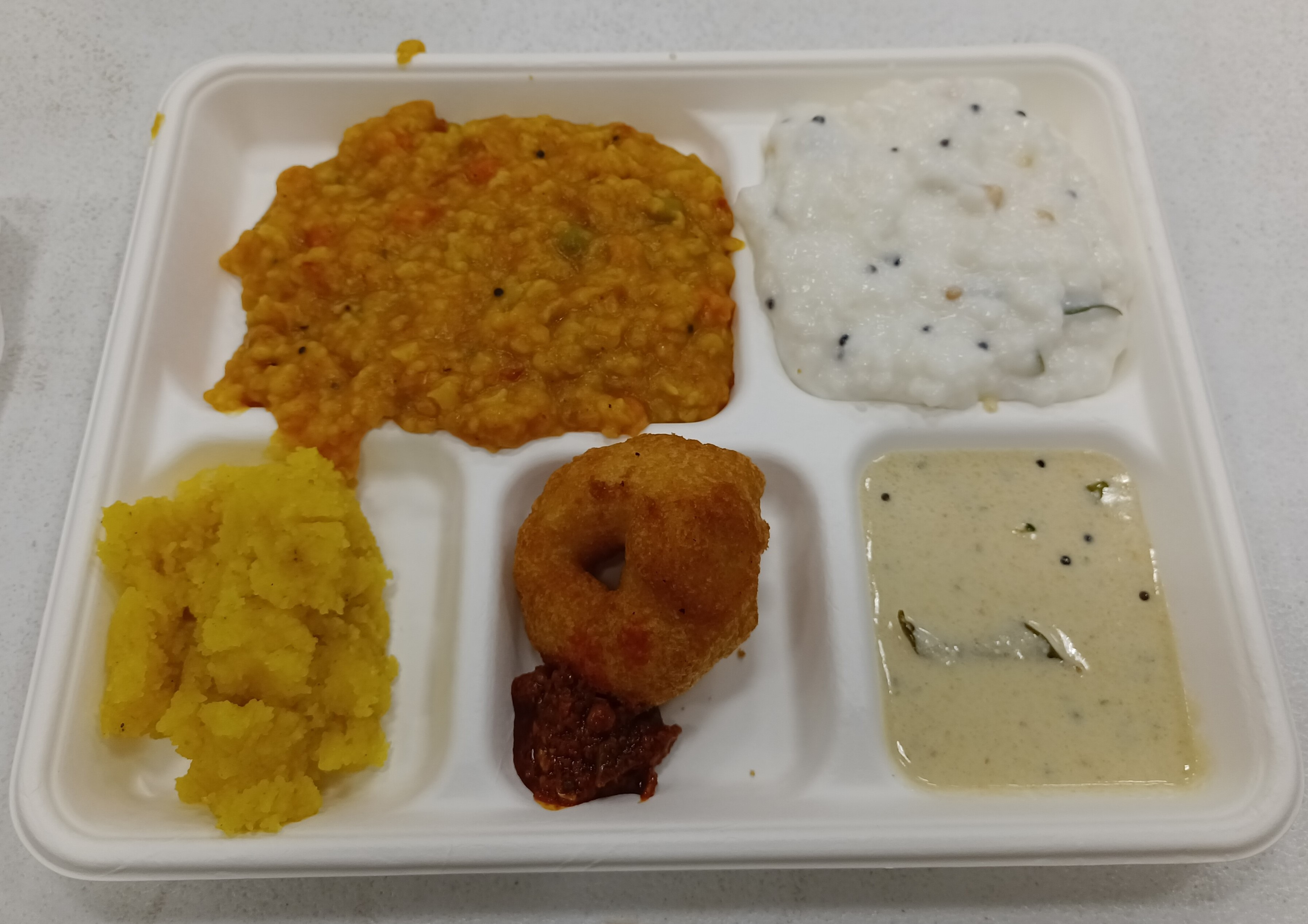
Prasada served at the Bharatiya Hindu Temple in Powell, Ohio, US

The prasada is to be consumed by attendees as a holy offering. The offerings may include cooked food, fruits and confectionery sweets. Vegetarian food is usually offered and later distributed to the devotees who are present in the temple. Sometimes this vegetarian offering will exclude prohibited items such as garlic, onion, mushroom, etc.

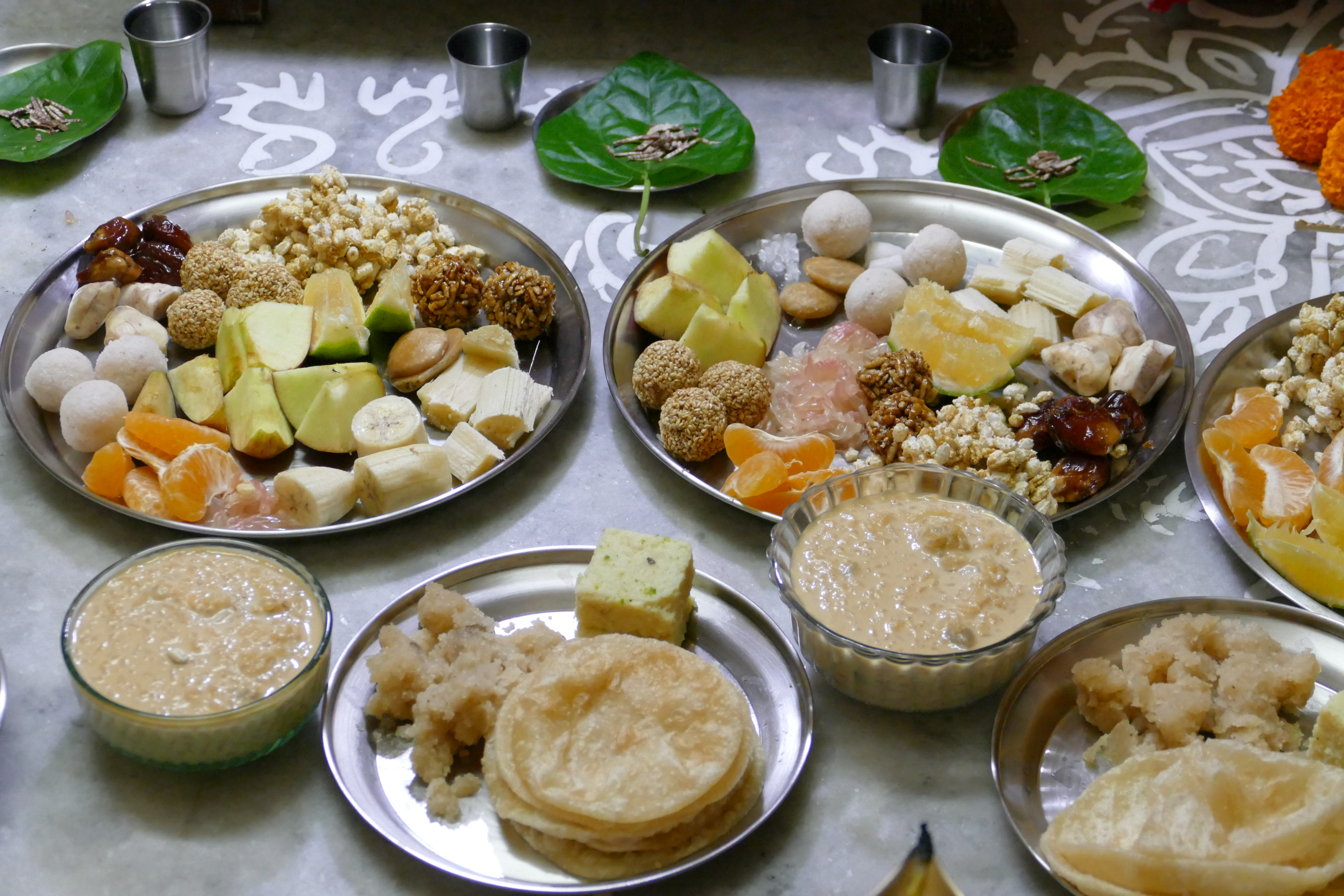
Naivedya offered in a home puja in West Bengal, India

Non-vegetarian is prohibited in some of the temples. Offering of food items forms part of the upachara or services to a Hindu deity in many Hindu traditions but is not universal. The murti (icon) is revered as a living entity who is offered food, fruits, and betelnut among others.

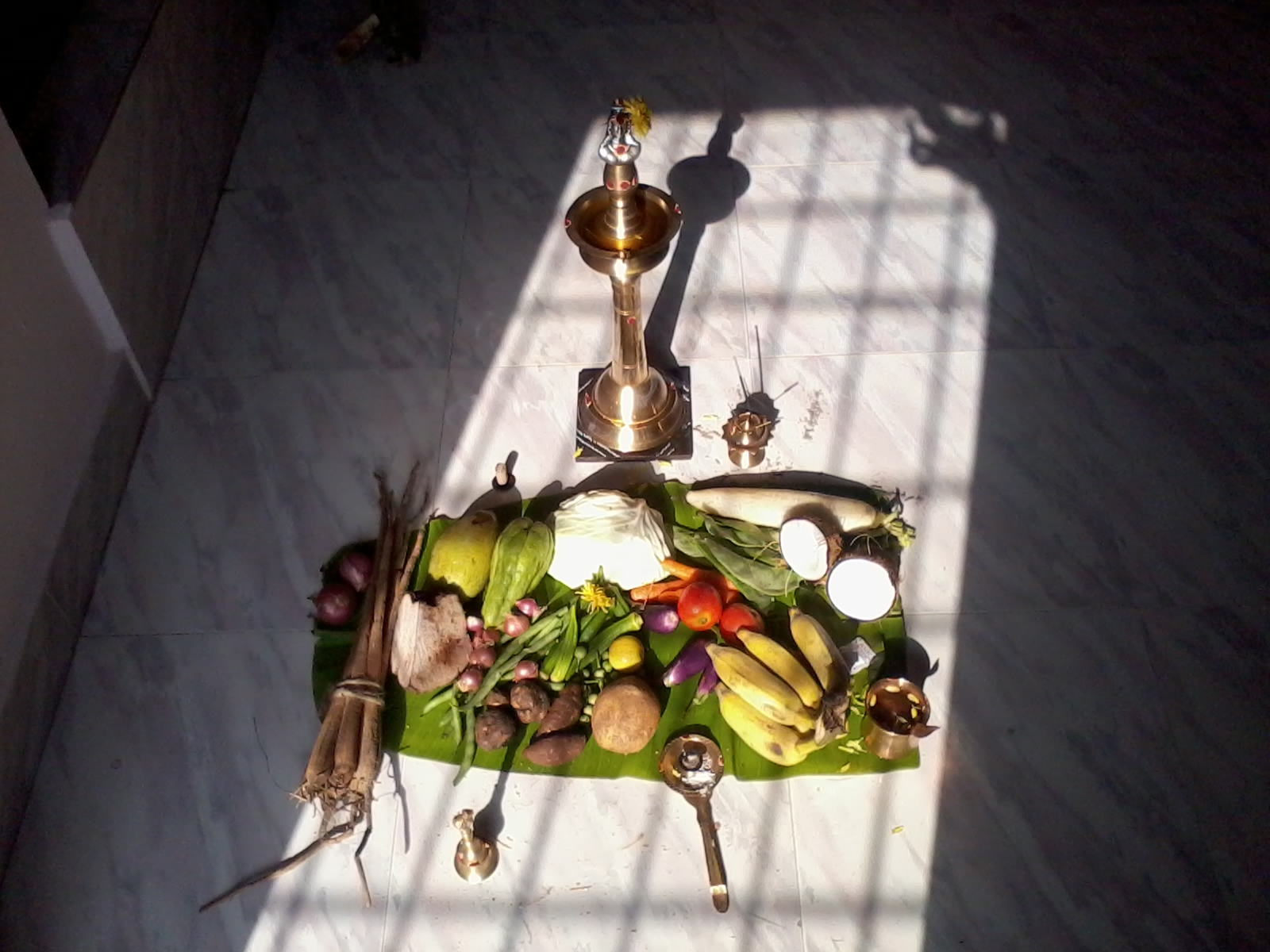
Offering of fresh produce before cooking in Tamil Nadu, India

In its material sense, prasada is created by a process of giving and receiving between a human devotee and the god. For example, a devotee makes an offering of a material substance such as flowers, fruits, or sweets. The deity then 'enjoys' or tastes a bit of the offering. This now-divinely invested substance is called prasada and is received by the devotee to be ingested, worn, smelled, etc. It may be the same material that was originally offered or material offered by others and then re-distributed to other devotees. In many temples, several kinds of prasada (e.g., nuts, sweets) are distributed to the devotees.

Offering food and subsequently receiving prasada is central to the practice of puja. Any food that is offered either physically to the image of the god or silently in prayer is considered prasada. At the same time, both conceptualizarions of and practices relating to prasada vary widely, for these are closely linked to particular philosophies and regions, among other factors.

In Sikhism, karah parshad is served to the congregation after prayer and reading of scripture. Parshad represents the same values as langar in that it is served indiscriminately.

Kurukshetra Prasadam (Channa laddu) in 48 kos parikrama of Kurukshetra, Tirupati Laddu and Mathura peda in the Braj Parikrama are geo-specialty prasada.
