= Kumkuma =

Indian powder

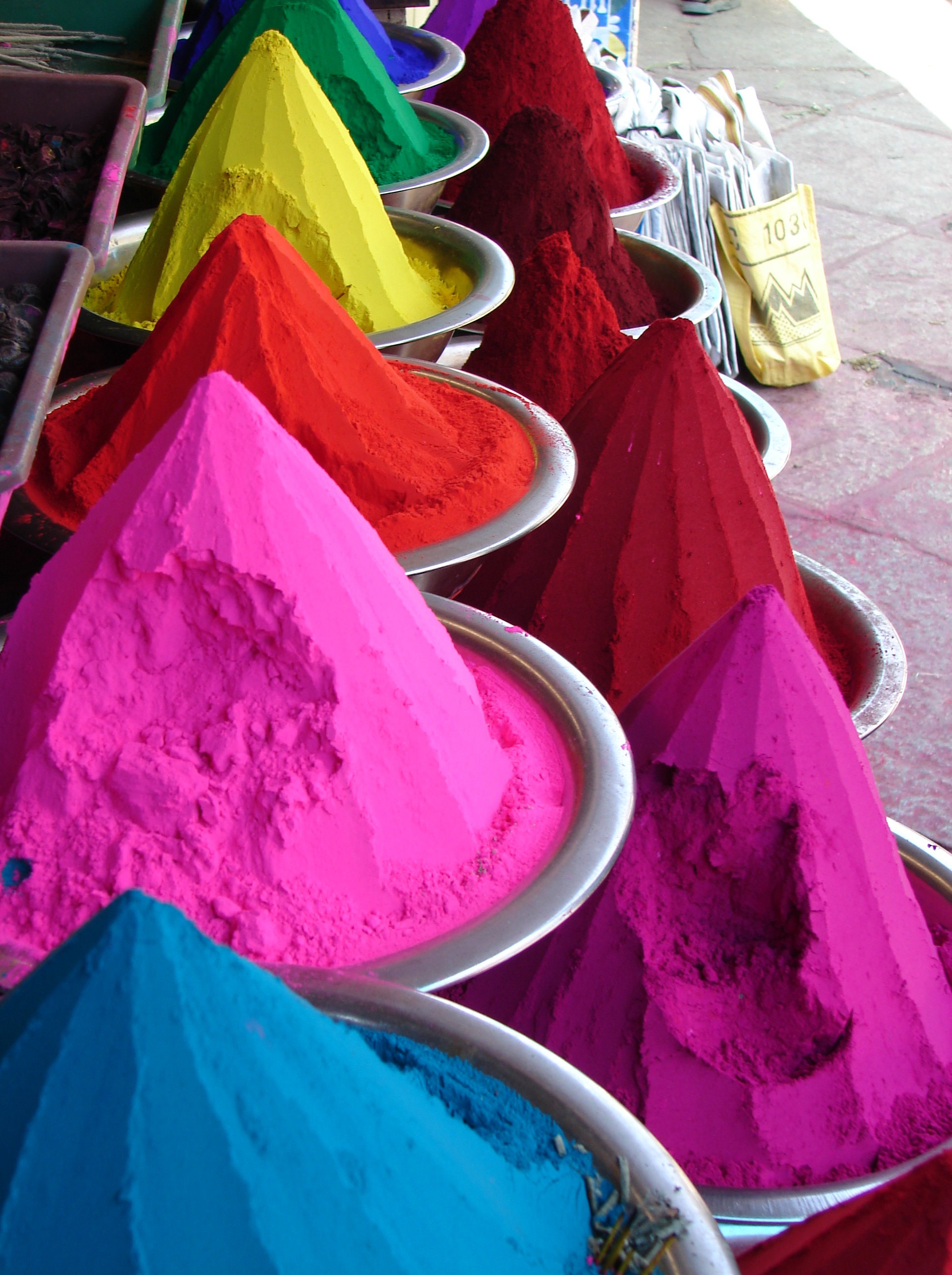
Kumkuma powder from Mysore, India.

Kumkuma is a powder used for social and religious markings in India. It is made from turmeric or any other local materials. The turmeric is dried and powdered with a bit of slaked lime, which turns the rich yellow powder into a red color.

In India, it is known by many names including kuṅkumam (Sanskrit कुङ्कुमम्, Tamil குங்குமம், and Malayalam കുങ്കുമം), kumkuma (Kannada ಕುಂಕುಮ,Telugu కుంకుమ), kukum (Konkani कुकूम्), kunku (Marathi कुंकू), kanku (Gujarati કંકુ), kumkum (Bengali কুমকুম and Hindi कुमकुम).

== Application ==
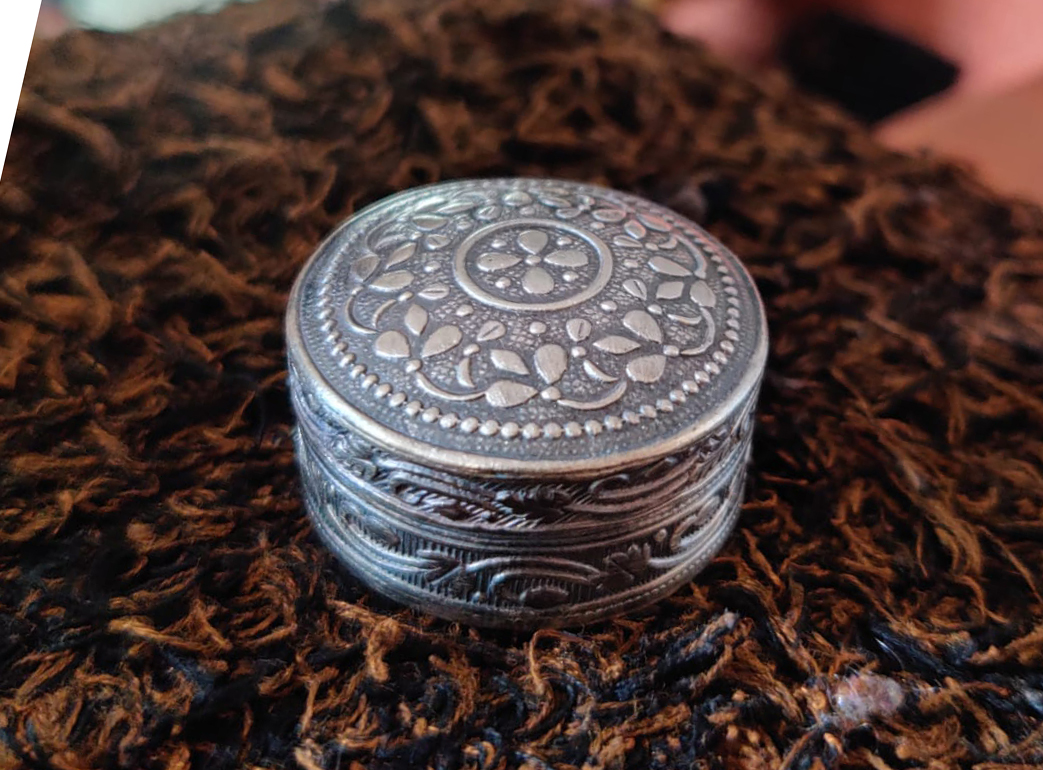
Traditional silver container for Sindoor/Kumkuma

Kumkuma is most often applied by Hindus to the forehead, typically at or between the eyebrows.

One explanation draws on tantric physiology, in which they body is mapped with a set of chakras ("wheels" or energy centers) running from the base of the spine to the crown of the head. The sixth chakra, the ajna chakra or "third eye", sits between the eyebrows and is associated with intuition and spiritual perception–where the mark is conventionally placed.

Thus, the kumkuma is placed where Indians believe to be the most important spot for receptivity to be enhanced.

== Common forehead marks ==
- Shaivites: Followers of Shiva usually apply three white horizontal lines (made from vibhuti) with a dot of kumkuma at the center. This is also known as tripundra.
- Vaishnavas: Followers of Vishnu make use of "white clay to apply two vertical lines joined at the base and intersected by a bright red streak." Many times the clay is applied in a U-shape. This is known as Urdhva Pundra tilaka.
- Shaktas: Shaktas of most Sampradayas usually apply a dot of vermillion in the center of the forehead with turmeric smeared around it.
- Swaminarayana: Followers of the Swaminarayan faith apply kumkuma at the center of the forehead and between a U-shaped tilaka. The tilaka is normally yellow and made from sandalwood.
- Chandrakor: Many Maharashtrians – men, women, and children alike – wear it traditionally in the shape of crescent moon.

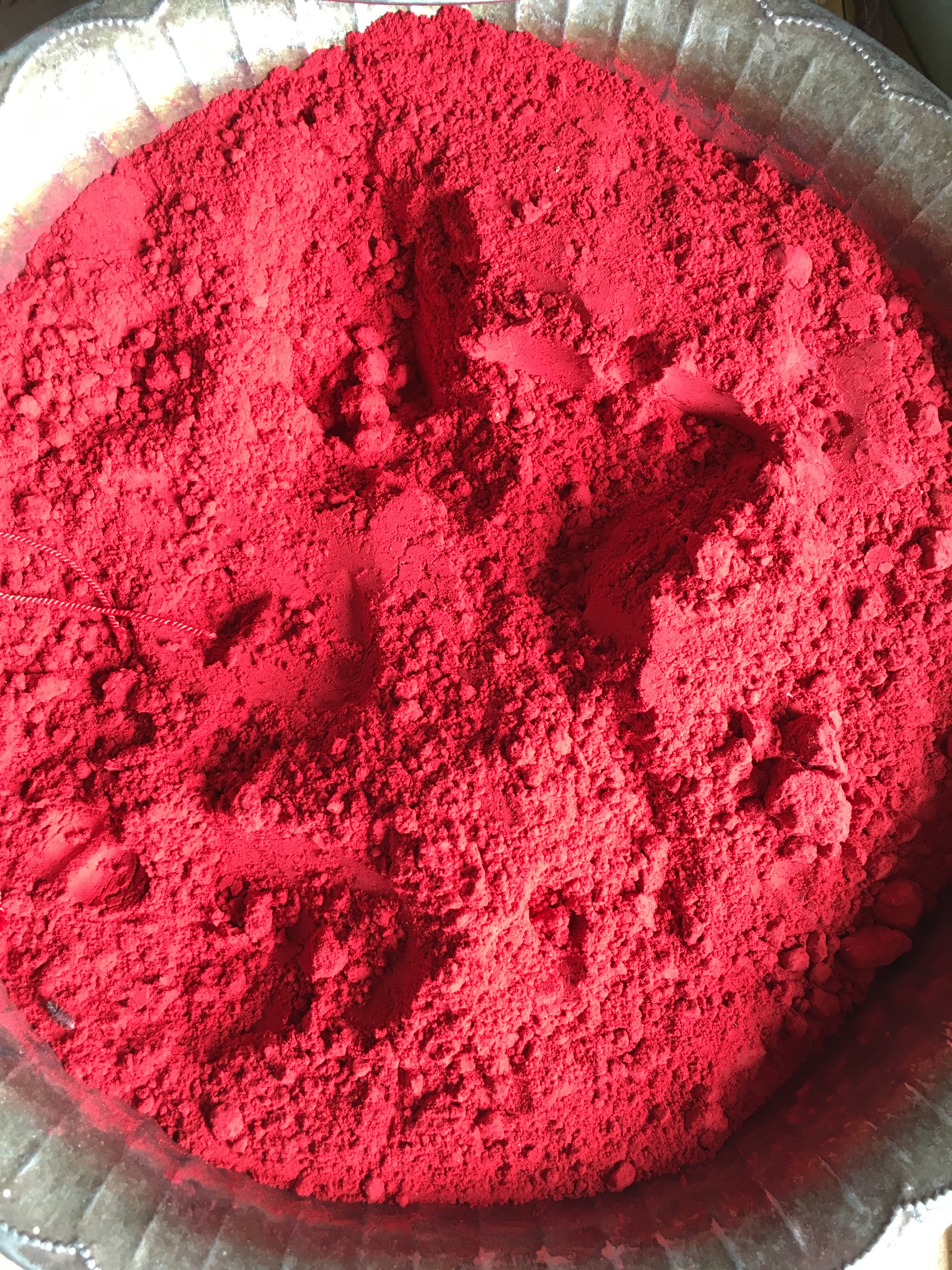
Kungumam (Kumkuma) sold near Hindu temple in Srirangam, Tamil Nadu, India

== Significance ==
In the Vaishnava tradition, the "white lines represent the footprint of their God, while the red refers to his consort, Lakshmi". The Swaminarayana tradition holds that the tilaka (yellow U-shaped mark) "is a symbol of the lotus feet of Paramatma," and the kumkuma "represents the bhakta" (devotee). In both of these traditions, the forehead mark serves as a reminder that a devotee of God should always remain protected at the feet of God.

The 'color' of the womb is yellow and is symbolically represented by turmeric. The blood stains on the womb is represented by kumkuma. It is believed that the combination of turmeric and kumkuma represents prosperity.

=== Kumkuma and women ===
When a girl or a married woman visits a house, it is a sign of respect (in case of an elderly lady) or blessings (in case of a girl) to offer kumkuma to them when they leave. However, normally it is not offered to widows (it is actually orthodoxy and superstition). If kumkuma is given to widow, there will be no harm as 'bidhaba' or 'sadhaba' depends only on consideration; it's neither law of nature nor God.

Men, women, girls, and boys also apply a dot of red turmeric powder on their forehead when visiting a temple or during a pooja. Kumkuma at temples is found in heaps. People dip their thumb or ring finger into the powder and apply it on the forehead or between the eyebrows.

In most of India, married women apply red kumkuma to the parting of their hair above their forehead every day as a symbol of marriage. This is called vermilion, or in Hindi, sindoor. In India, many unmarried girls wear a bindi every day.

== Making kumkuma ==
Kumkum is made from turmeric by adding slaked lime.

== Other uses ==
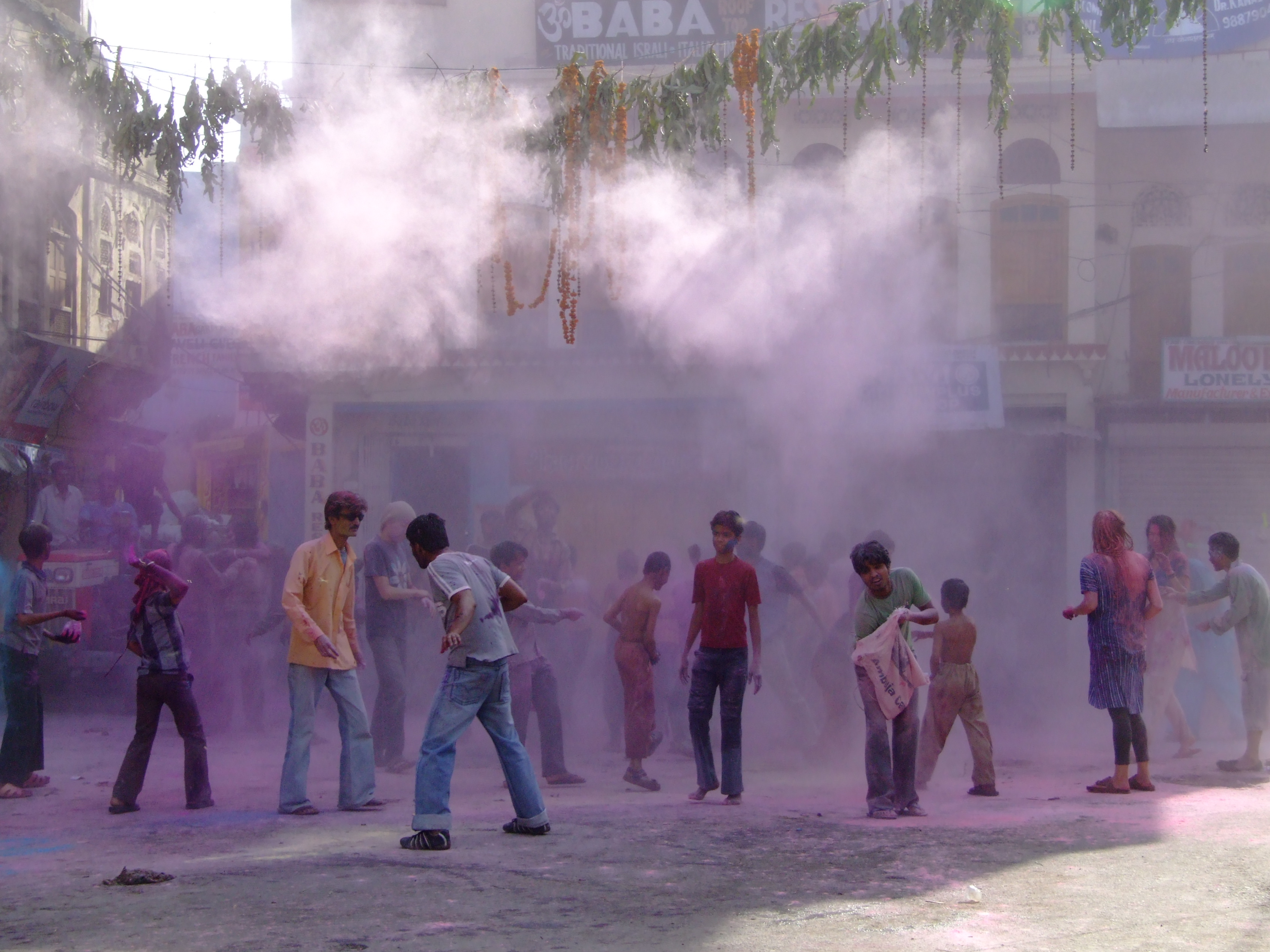
Holi celebrations in Pushkar, Rajasthan.

Kumkuma is also widely used for worshiping the Hindu goddesses, especially Shakti and Lakshmi, and kumkuma powder is thrown (along with other mixtures) into the air during Holi (the Festival of Colours), a popular Hindu spring festival.

Sanatan Sanstha has published an article which mentions that Kumkuma also is believed to prevent "negative energies entering the body".

== See also ==
- Haldi Kumkum
- Bindi
- Tilaka
- List of materials used in Hinduism
- Category:Hindu iconography
