= Darshan (Indian religions) =

Auspicious sight of a deity or holy person

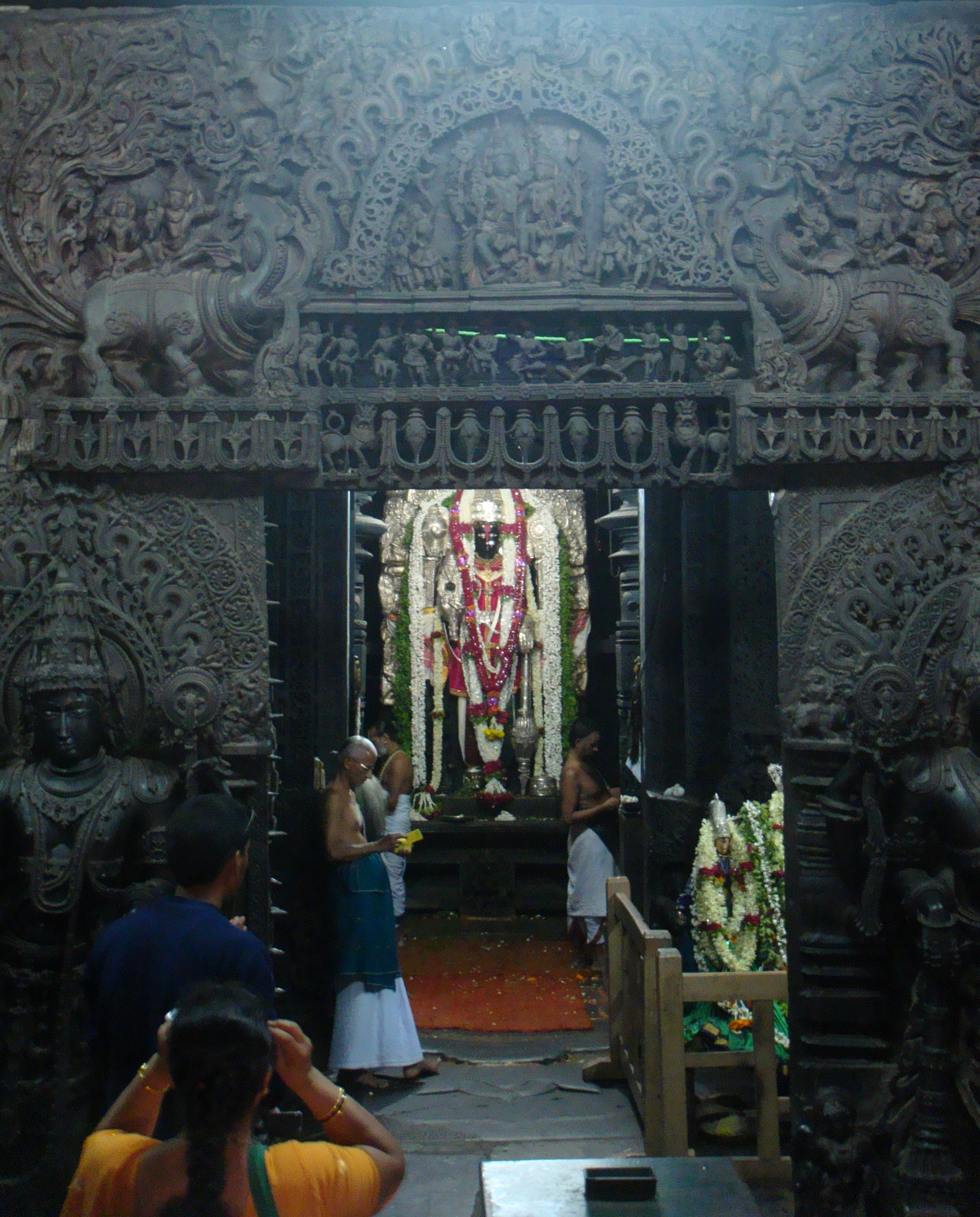
A darshana literally means a 'sight' or 'view'. In a Hindu temple, the term refers to viewing the garbhagriha 'inner sanctum' of the temple, which hosts the murti 'image of a god'. Devotees taking darshana of the god Vishnu in the inner sanctum of the Chennakeshava Temple, Belur.

In Indian religions, a darshan (Sanskrit: दर्शन, IAST: darśana; lit. 'showing, appearance, view, sight') or darshana is, literally, the auspicious sight or viewing of a deity or a holy person. The meaning of the term has also extended to signify any of the traditional schools of Indian philosophy. Often, it specifically refers to any of the six orthodox Hindu schools and their associated bodies of literature. Here, the term connotes the 'instrument of vision'.

== Etymology ==
The word darśana is derived from the Sanskrit root of दर्शन, dṛś, which means 'to look at' or 'to view', or a vision, apparition, or glimpse.

== Definition ==
Darshana is described as an "auspicious sight" of a holy person, which bestows merit on the viewer.

It is most commonly used for theophany, meaning a manifestation or vision of the divine.

== In Hinduism ==
In Hindu worship, it refers to seeing a deity (especially in image form) or a very holy person or artifact. One can receive darshana or a glimpse of the deity in the temple, or from a saintly person such as a great guru. One can also take darshana of a sacred places like Kashi, Yamuna, or Mount Kailash.

In Hindu practice, adherents often refer to their temple visits as going for darshana rather than simply for worship. Darshana, often translated as the "auspicious sight" of the divine, involves seeing the deity's image (murti). This visual experience is charged with religious significance, as the deity is believed to be present in the image, allowing worshippers to receive divine blessings through their gaze.

The term darshana also refers to the six systems of thought that comprise classical Hindu philosophy. In this sense, the term does not only mean 'vision', but connotes the 'instrument of vision', such as a worldview or a philosophical system. The term implies how each of these six systems distinctively looks at things and the scriptures in Indian philosophy. The six Hindu darshanas are Nyāya, Vaiśeṣika, Sāṅkhya, Yoga, Mīmāṃsā, and Vedānta. Buddhism and Jainism are examples of non-Hindu darshanas.

== Mahayana Buddhism ==
On the significance of darshana in Mahayana thought, Paul Harrison writes: "By the second century CE... the vision of the Buddha (buddha-darśana) and the accompanying hearing of the Dharma (dharma-śravaṇa) are represented as a transformation experience of decisive importance for practitioners, be they who have renounced (mundane life) 'ascetics' or householders."

The Abhidharma, collections of systematic summaries of the sutras, mention Darshana-citta, i.e. visions.

The Indian Mahayana philosophers Vasubandhu and Asanga acknowledged five paths to liberation, of which the third is darshana-marga, the "path of seeing".

Nagarjuna, a prominent philosopher of the Madhyamaka school of Mahayana Buddhism, wrote that the wise person perceives tattva-darshana, true reality.

== Other meanings ==
Darshana also sometimes has a more mundane meaning. For example, Sivananda Saraswati wrote in his book The Practice of Brahmacharya that one of the eight aspects of brahmacharya (celibacy) is not to look lustfully at women: "You should carefully avoid ... Darshana or looking at women with passionate resolve".

Scholar of religion Richard H. Davis has said that darshana (viewpoint, philosophical school) is one of three terms in classical Indian discourse that could be considered roughly analogous to what today's English-speakers understand as "religion." The other two terms are dharma (duty, morality, a code of proper conduct) and marga (route, spiritual path). According to Davis, "most Hindu texts accepted that religious paths (marga) are relative to the points of view (darśana) and moral responsibilities (dharma) of practitioners, whose individual circumstances may make one or another course of action more appropriate in their particular situations."

Poet Gary Snyder has given a naturalistic meaning to darshana:

It's a gift; it's like there's a moment in which the thing is ready to let you see it. In India, this is called darshan. Darshan means getting a view, and if the clouds blow away, as they did once for me, and you get a view of the Himalayas from the foothills, an Indian person would say, "Ah, the Himalayas are giving you their darshana"; they're letting you have their view. This comfortable, really deep way of getting a sense of something takes time. It doesn't show itself to you right away. It isn't even necessary to know the names of things the way a botanist would. It's more important to be aware of the "suchness" of the thing; it's a reality. It's also a source of a certain kind of inspiration for creativity. I see it in the work of Georgia O'Keeffe...

== See also ==
- Blessing
- Dharma transmission
- Guru–shishya tradition
- Jharokha Darshan
- Pranāma
