= Upachara =

In Hinduism, offerings and services made to a deity

In Hinduism, upachara (Sanskrit: उपचार; service or courtesy) refers to the offerings and services made to a deity as part of worship.

== List ==
Krishnananda Agamavagisha states in the Brihat Tantrasara that the main worship is conducted with 5, 10, 16 or 18 articles. These are

=== Panchopachara ===
This is the most basic mode, used for everyday offerings. It includes

1. Gandha : Fragrant items like agarwood, musk & sandalwood
2. Pushpa : Flowers & leaves
3. Dhupa : Incense
4. Dipa: offering of lamps/ light
5. Naivedya : Food consisting of uncooked(like fruits & milk) & cooked(like payasam, boiled rice, vegetables, curry & dal) dishes

=== Dashopachara ===
Alongside the 5 articles mentioned above, it also includes 5 additional items which are

1. Padya : Water for washing feet
2. Arghya : An offering consisting of water, durva, flowers & raw rice grains given in the hands of a guest in ancient times as a sign of reception & respect
3. Achamaniya : Water for rinsing lips for achamana
4. Madhuparka : An offering of honey mixed with curd, ghee, milk & sugar in specific quantities given before starting any ceremony as a sign of reception
5. Punarachamaniya : Water for achamana to be offered after giving madhuparka

=== Shodashopachara ===
This is most prevalent mode. Apart from the articles mentioned in the previous list (except Madhuparka), it includes 8 additional items which are

1. Āvāhana : Invocation/Invitation; Invoking presence of the deity
2. Snaniya : Water offered for bathing
3. Vastra : New, unstitched, clean, unused clothes for wearing. For male deities, it is dhoti & uttariya while for female deities it is sari.
4. Alamkara : Traditional jewellery
5. Tambula : Offering of paan after naivedya
6. Tarpana : Offering libations of water for satisfaction of disembodied & divine beings. In practice it is substituted with offerings of drinks like drinking water & Pānakaṃ alongside naivedya.
7. Stotra : Recitation of hymns & eulogies of the deity who is worshipped.
8. Namaskara : Bowing down or prostrating before the deity with folded hands in reverence.

=== Astadashopachara ===
It includes all articles mentioned in the previous list except Punarachamaniya, Tambula & Stotra, it includes 5 additional items which are

1. Asana : Offering a seat in the form of a mat for sitting on ground or low stool made of wood or metals like gold & silver.
2. Svagata : Greetings of reception given by the host(the priest in this case) to the guest( the deity in this case).
3. Malya : Garlands made of flowers & leaves.
4. Anulepana : Unguents like sandalwood for anointing the body.
5. Upavita : Offering sacred thread

Some texts include all abovementioned articles(without omitting any) alongside additional articles like shayya(bedding) & chhatra(umbrella). Additional items offered in case of female deities include lac, collyrium & vermilion. Some deities are offered articles which aren't offered to other deities. For example, alcohol is offered to Kali.
