= Tulasi Vrindavana =

Altar of tulasi plant in a Hindu courtyard

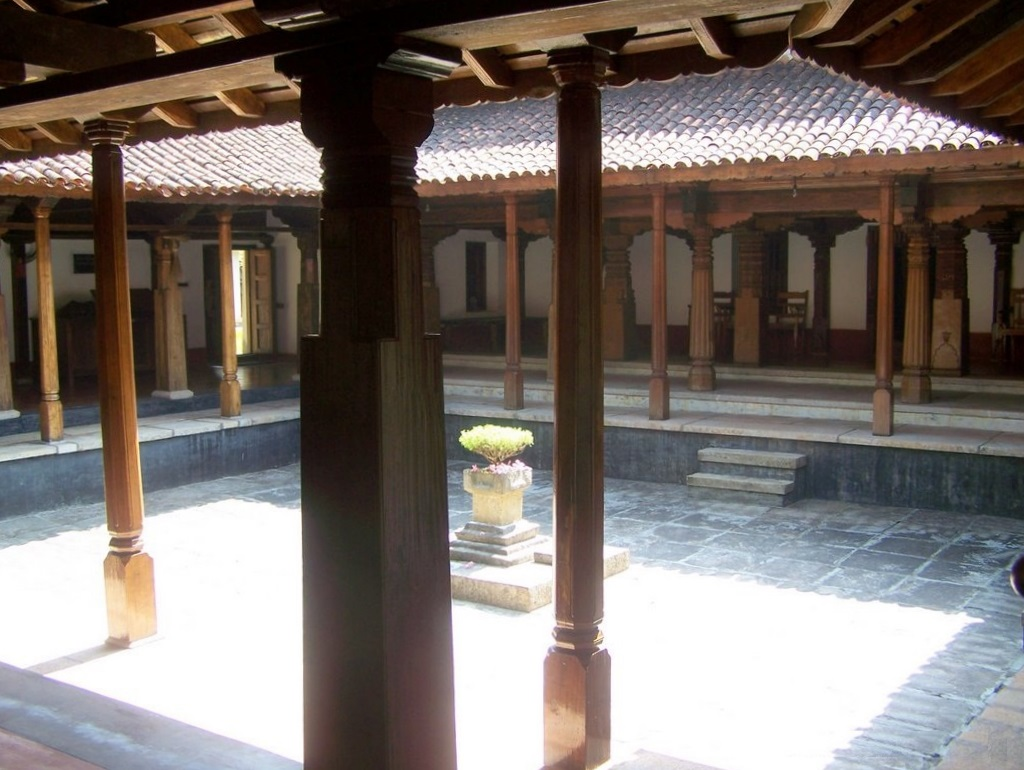
A Tulasi Vrindavana (tulasi shrine) in courtyard, India.

A Tulasi Vrindavana (Sanskrit: तुलसीवृंदावन, romanized: Tulasīvṛndāvana) is a small podium-like stone or cement altar present in front of traditional Hindu houses, housing the sacred tulasi plant. Tulasi is an aromatic plant in the family Lamiaceae, native throughout the tropics, and widespread as a cultivated plant and an escaped weed.

The structure is also known as Tulasi Thara (Malayalam: തുളസിത്തറ), Tulasi Chaura (Odia: ତୁଳସୀ ଚଉରା), Tulasi Brindavanam (Tamil: துளசி பிருந்தாவனம்), Tulasi Brundavanam (Telugu: తులసి బృందావనం), and Tulasi Mancha (Bengali: তুলসী মঞ্চ) in Indian regional languages.

== Significance ==
Hindu literature personifies the tulasi plant as the goddess Tulasi. According to a legend from the Brahma Vaivarta Purana, Saraswati, Ganga, and Lakshmi were the three wives of the preserver deity, Vishnu. An argument once ensued between a resentful Saraswati and Ganga, with the latter being accused of trying to get too close to their common husband. Lakshmi attempted to pacify both of them, but in the ensuing quarrel, the three of them had cursed each other to be incarnated on earth: Saraswati and Ganga became rivers, while Lakshmi incarnated as the tulasi plant.

In a different legend from the Devi Bhagavata Purana, Lakshmi incarnated herself as Tulasi, the daughter of King Dharmadhvaja. She married Shankacuda, a wicked asura who was the incarnation of Krishna's friend, Sudama. Shiva fought Shankacuda in a battle, but the latter proved to be an invincible opponent due to his wife's fidelity to him. Vishnu assumed the guise of Shankacuda, and had sex with Tulasi, until she realised that he was an imposter. As she was about to curse him, Vishnu informed her of her true identity as his consort. Shiva was able to defeat the asura in the conflict. Liberated from earthly existence, Sudama returned to Goloka, while Tulasi transferred her earthly form to the tulasi plant, and rejoined Vishnu as Lakshmi in Vaikuntha.

=== Tulasi Vivaha ===
A ceremony known as Tulasi Vivaha is performed by Hindus between Prabodhini Ekadashi (the eleventh lunar day of the waxing moon of Kartika) to Kartik Purnima (full moon in Kartika), usually on the eleventh or the twelfth lunar day. It is the ceremonial wedding of the goddess Tulasi, represented by the tulasi plant to Vishnu, in the form of the symbolic Shaligram or an image of Krishna or Rama. Both the bride and the groom are ritually worshipped, and then married as per traditional Hindu wedding rituals. It marks the end of the four-month Chaturmasya period, which corresponds to the monsoon, considered inauspicious for marriages, Spiritual beliefs and other rituals. This day inaugurates the annual marriage season in India.

== Worship practices ==
The daily care and worship of the tulasi plant at the Vrindavana is traditionally the responsibility of the women of the household. Though daily worship is prescribed, Tuesdays and Fridays are considered especially sacred for tulasi worship. Rituals involve watering the plant, cleaning the surrounding area, and making offerings of flowers, incense, Ganges water, and food. Rangoli patterns depicting deities may be drawn at the base of the structure. Devotees circumambulate (pradakshina) the plant while chanting mantras, seeking the divine grace of Vishnu.

The structure is traditionally placed in the central courtyard of the house or in front of the entrance, often facing east, so that the plant receives morning sunlight.

== In Odisha ==
The Tulasi Chaura occupies a significant position in the traditional domestic and religious life of Odisha. It is commonly associated with the courtyard-based layout of traditional Odia houses and is often designed as a miniature shrine rather than a simple plant platform. Its architectural form, placement and associated rituals reflect the region's religious traditions and craftsmanship.

=== Architecture ===
Traditional Tulasi Chauras in Odisha range from simple elevated platforms to elaborate structures resembling miniature Hindu temples. While simpler examples are made of brick, earth or cement, traditional ornamental varieties are often crafted from terracotta.

The more elaborate structures incorporate architectural elements inspired by Kalinga architecture, including temple-like superstructures, decorative panels and sculptural motifs. Some examples feature representations of Hindu deities, mythological figures, animals and floral designs.

Terracotta Tulasi Chauras are produced using traditional pottery techniques, including wheel throwing, hand modelling and firing. The Odisha Crafts Museum (Kala Bhoomi) in Bhubaneswar documents these structures as part of the state's terracotta heritage.

=== Placement ===
In traditional Odia households, the Tulasi Chaura is generally situated in the agana (courtyard), often in a prominent and accessible position. The courtyard shrine forms an integral part of the domestic religious space and is commonly maintained by the household members.

The elevated structure provides a designated place for growing the Tulasi plant and conducting daily worship. Its central or prominent placement allows household members to perform rituals and circumambulate the shrine.

With changes in residential architecture and the gradual disappearance of traditional open courtyards in some urban areas, Tulasi Chauras are also constructed in verandas, terraces and other suitable spaces.

=== Festivals associated with it ===
The Tulasi Chaura is associated with several religious observances and festivals celebrated in Odisha.

==== Kartika Brata ====
During the Hindu month of Kartika, the Tulasi Chaura becomes an important centre of household worship. Devotees offer water and light lamps near the shrine. The surrounding area is often decorated with traditional designs known as Jhoti or Chita, made using rice paste or other natural materials.

==== Kartika Purnima ====
Kartika Purnima marks the conclusion of the Kartika month and is associated with several household religious observances. The Tulasi Chaura is traditionally decorated and worshipped on this occasion.

==== Deepabali ====
During Deepabali, the Tulasi Chaura is often illuminated with earthen lamps. In Odisha, it is also associated with Badabadua Daka, a traditional observance in which ancestors are remembered and invoked through the lighting of lamps and the burning of Kaunria Kathi (jute sticks).

==== Pana Sankranti ====
During Mesha Sankranti, also known as Pana Sankranti, some households observe the Basundhara Theki tradition. A small earthen pot containing water is suspended above the Tulasi plant, allowing water to drip gradually onto it.

== Cultural significance ==
The Tulasi Chaura represents the intersection of religious beliefs, domestic architecture and traditional craftsmanship. Beyond its function as a place of worship, it serves as a shared household space associated with daily rituals, seasonal observances and family traditions.

In Odisha, the elaborate terracotta varieties also reflect the adaptation of temple-inspired architectural elements into domestic structures. The continued presence of Tulasi Chauras in households illustrates the persistence of traditional religious practices despite changes in residential architecture and urban lifestyles.

== Gallery ==
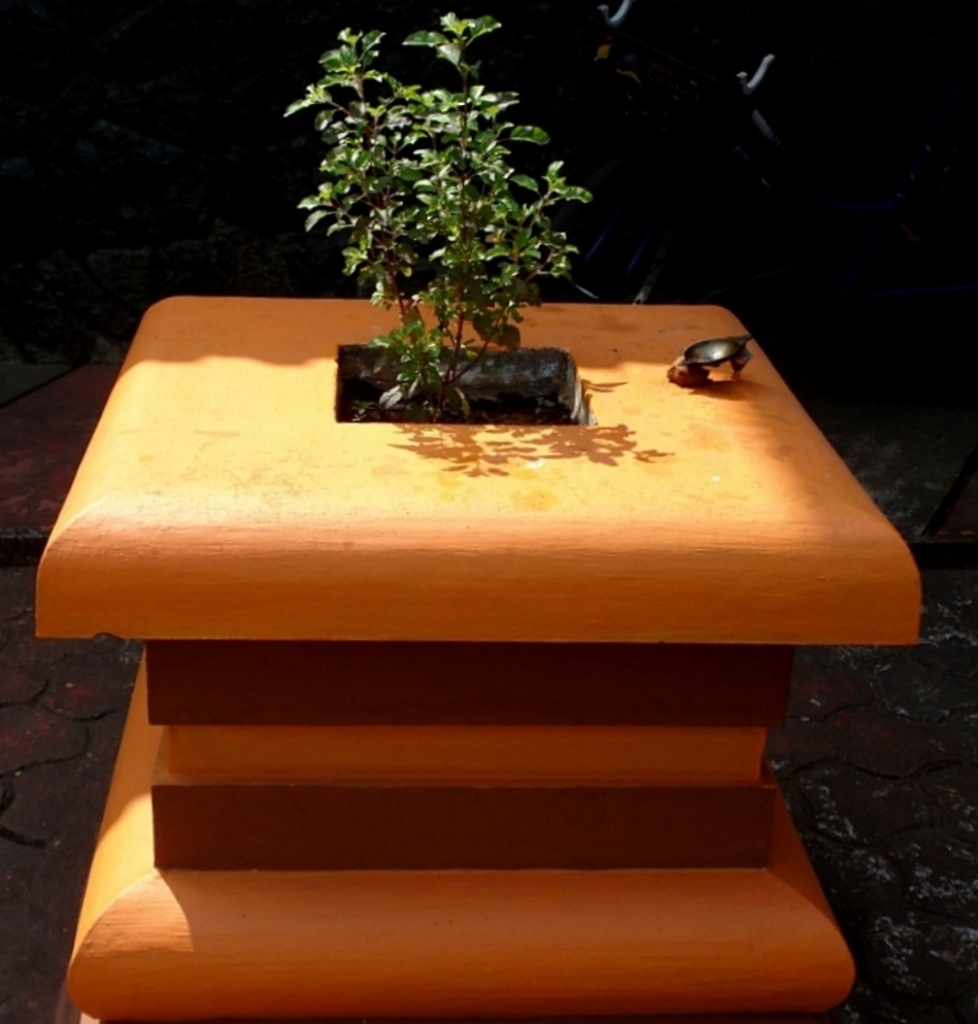
Tulasi Vrindavan in Kerala; also known as a tulasittara in Malayalam.

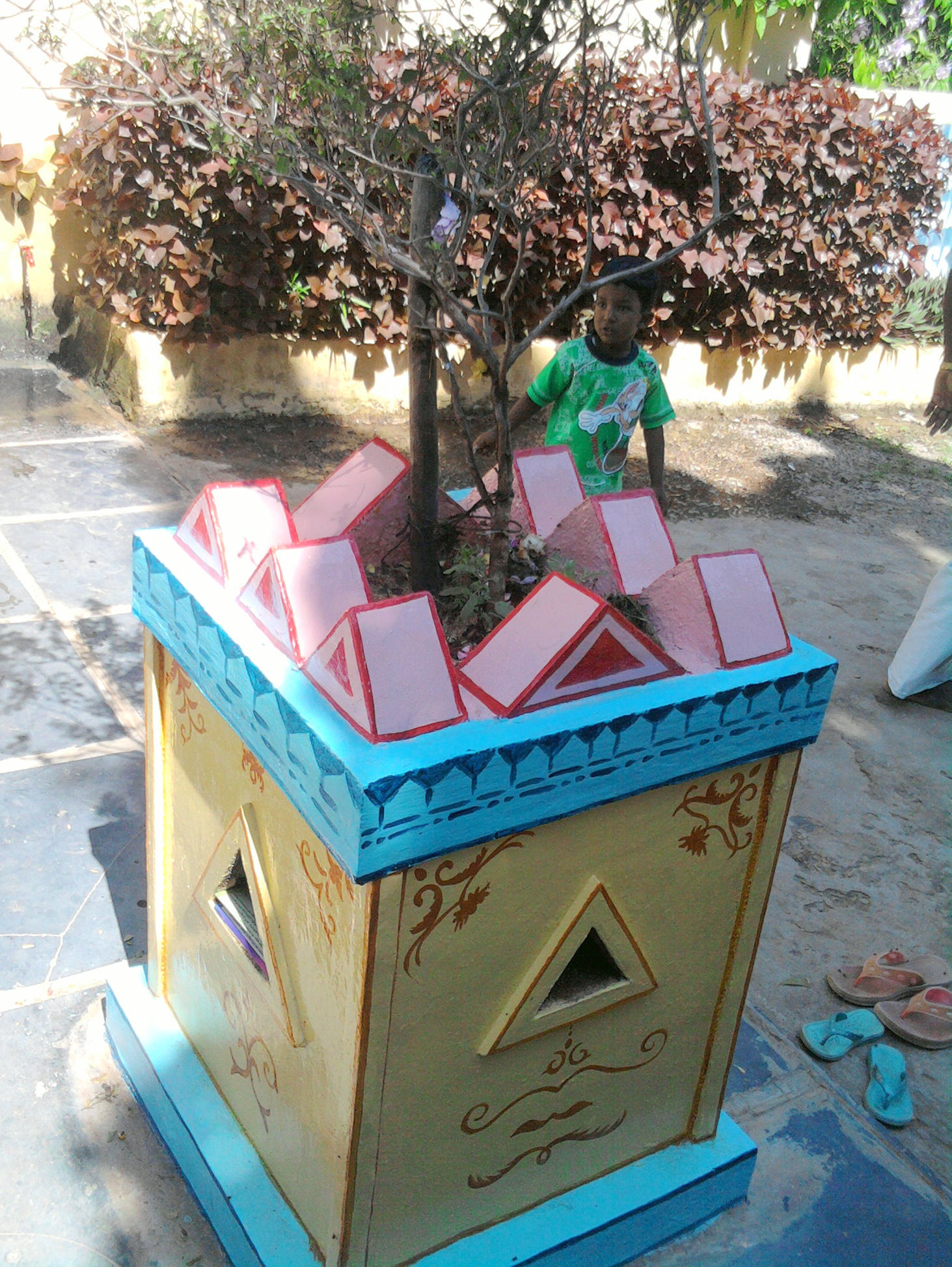
Tulasi Brundavanam or Tulasi Kota in a Telugu household.

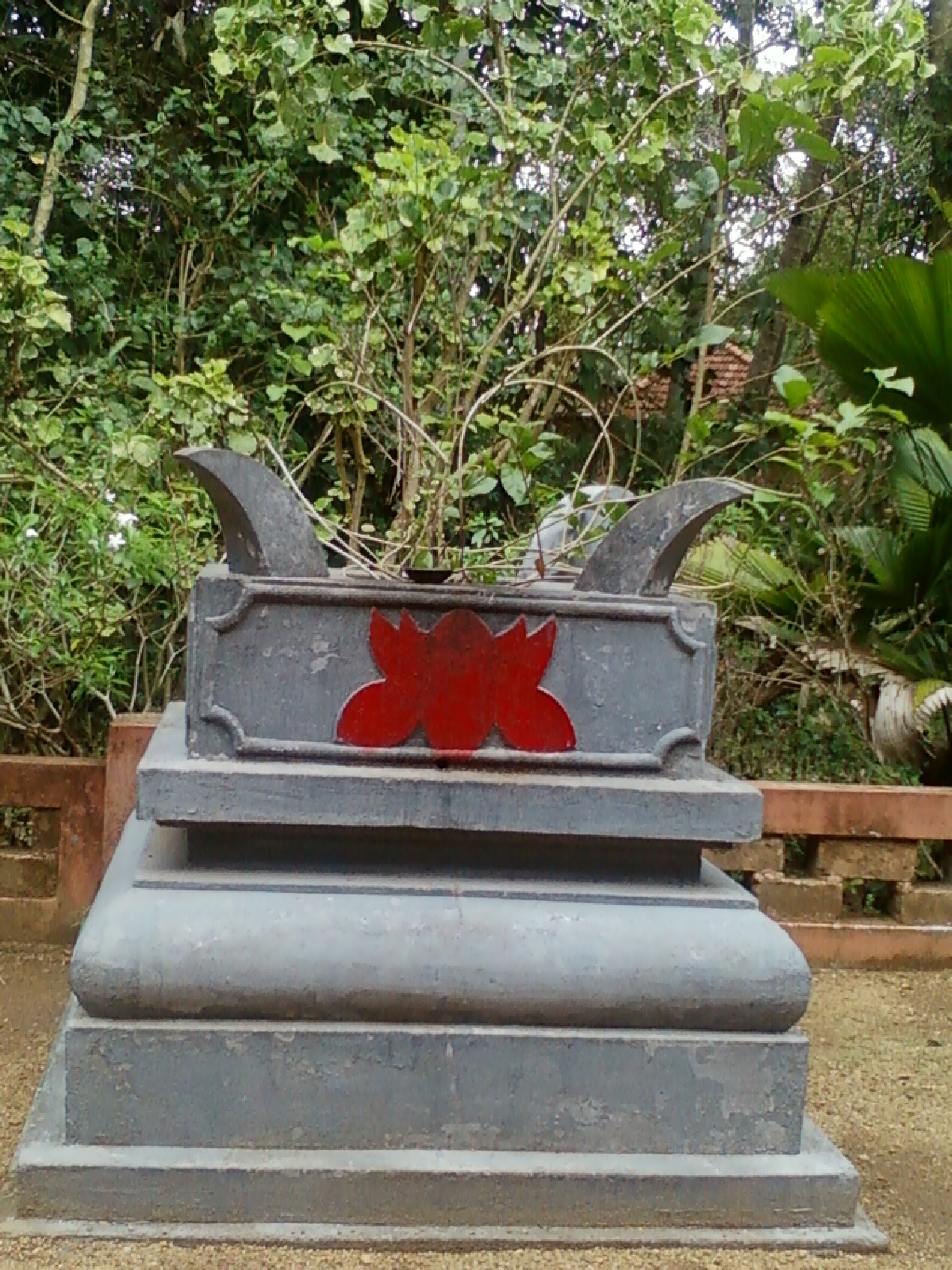
Tulasi Vrindavan in Kerala.

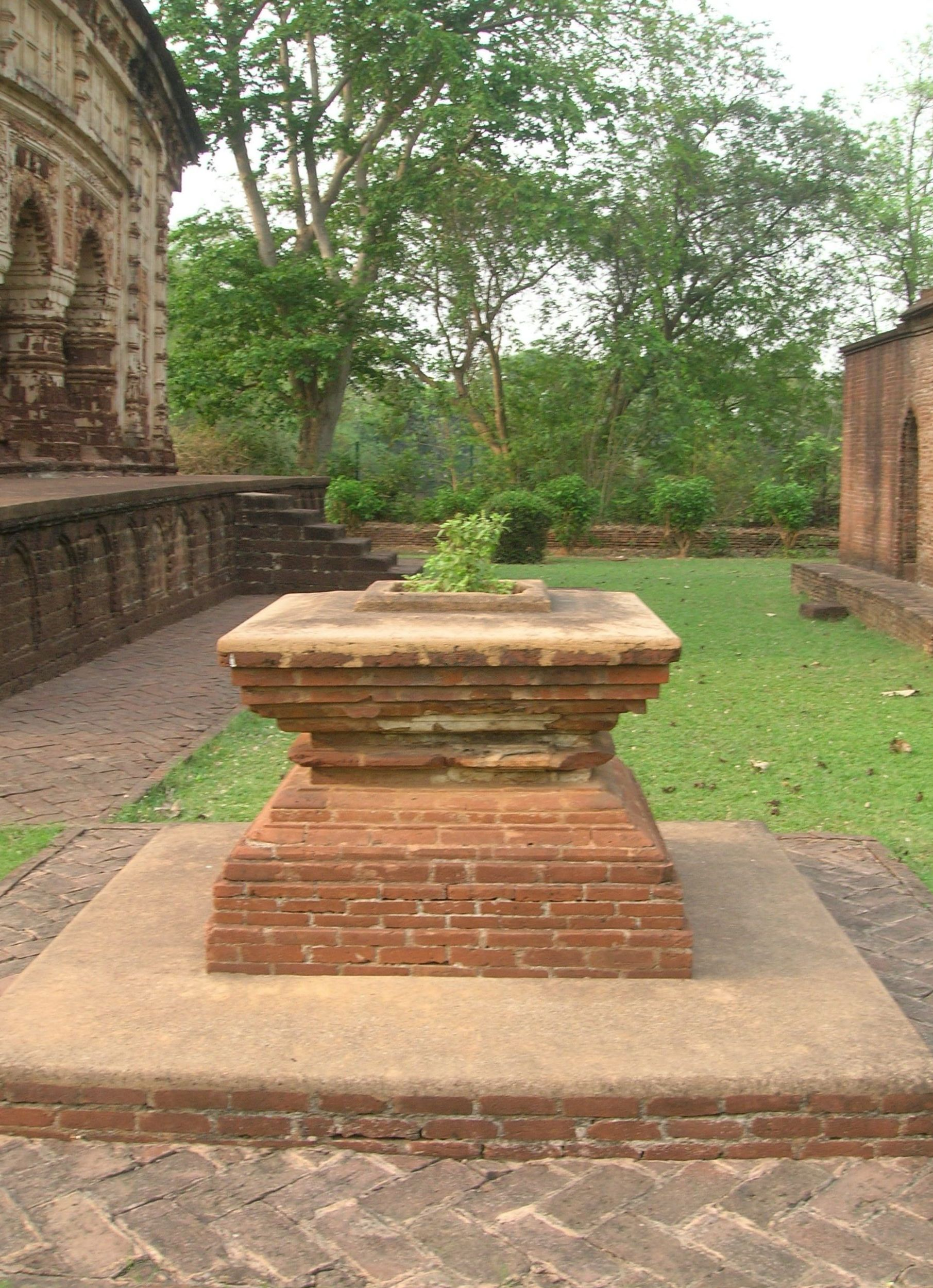
Tulasi Mancha at Radhamadhab Temple in West Bengal.

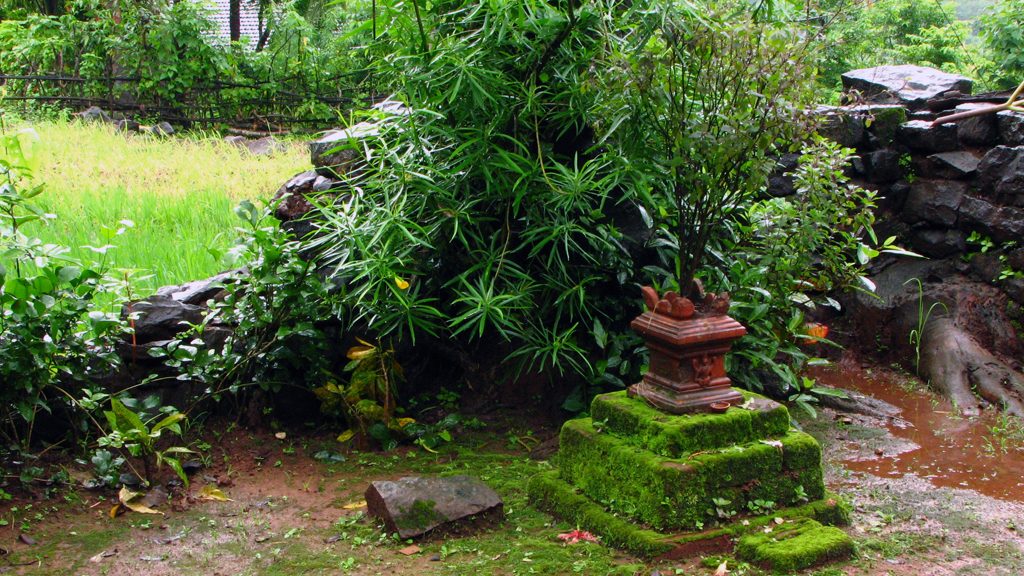
Tulasi Vrindavan in a rural house.

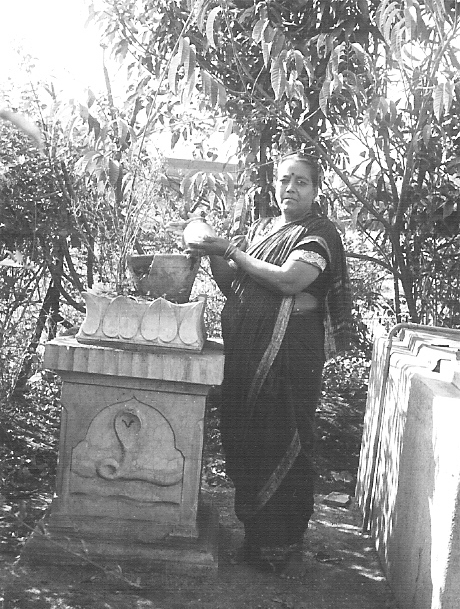
A woman from Maharashtra watering tulasi in 1970s.
