= Anjaneya Temple, Azhiyanilai =

Coordinates: 10.1971°N 78.9727°E

Anjaneya Temple at Azhiyanilai, near Arantangi, Pudukkottai district, Tamil Nadu, India, is a Hindu temple dedicated to the god Hanuman.

== Location ==
Azhiyanilai is located in Pudukkottai-Arantangi road at a distance of 29 km. from Pudukkottai.

== Presiding deity ==
Anjaneya, the presiding deity of the temple, is of 12 ft height. He is also known as Vishvarupa Anjaneyar. The statue of the presiding deity is found without ceiling. He is facing east. The devotees who worship the deity got rid of from all sufferings in life. Near the temple dhyana mandapa is found.

== Puja ==
During Saturdays special pujas are done to the deity. Tulsi garlands are worn to the deity.
