= Tulasi in Hinduism =

Personification of holy basil in Hinduism

Tulasi
- Personification of the Tulasi plant and the Narayani River
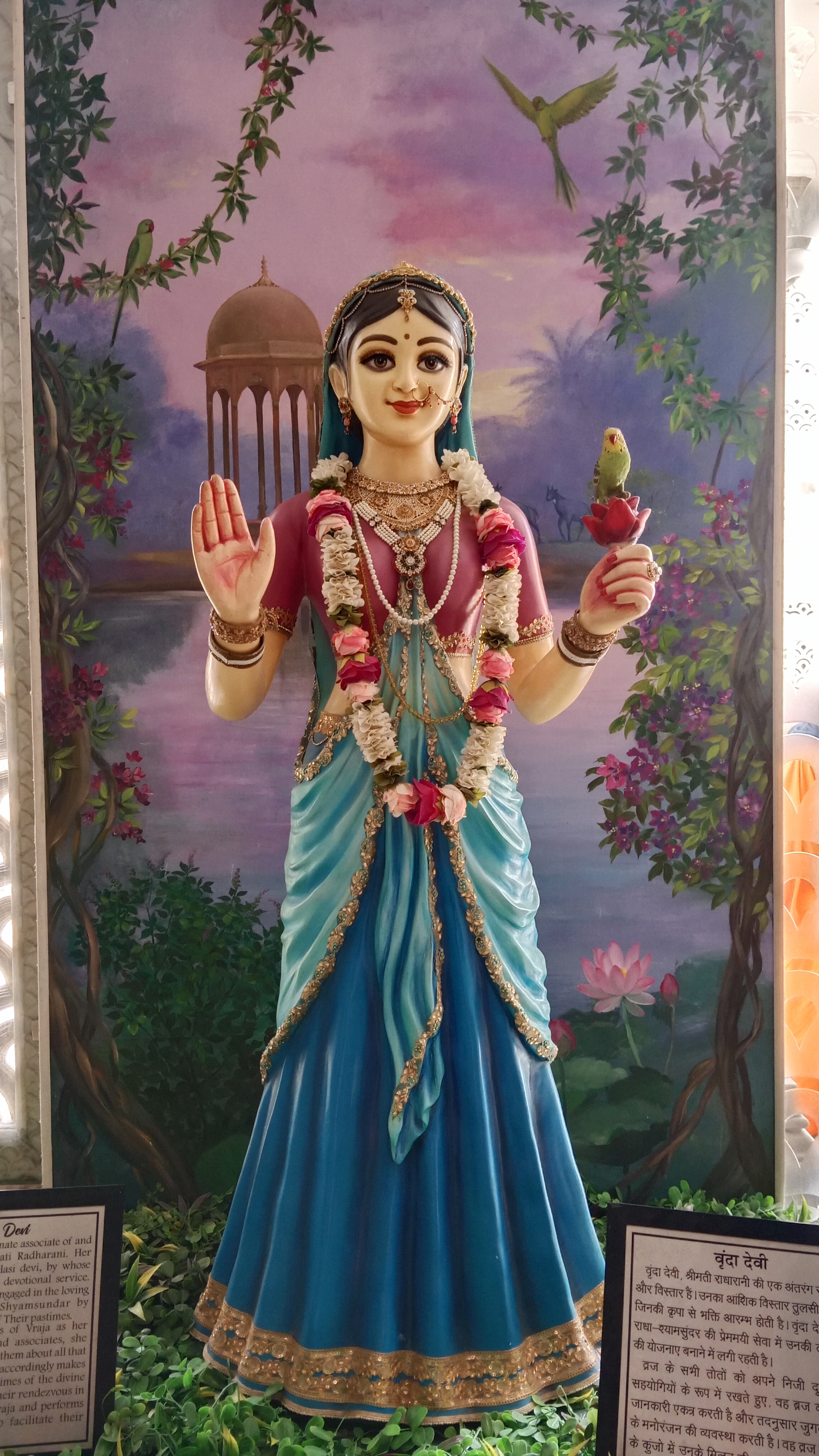
- Murti of Vrinda at ISKCON Temple, Vrindavan
- Other names: Vrinda
- Devanagari: तुलसी
- Sanskrit transliteration: Tulasi
- Affiliation: Devi, Lakshmi, Narayani River
- Abode: Bhuloka, Vaikuntha
- Symbol: Tulasi plant
- Festivals: Tulasi Vivaha
- Parents: Dharmadhvaja (father); Kalanemi and Svarna (as Vrinda)
- Consort: Vishnu (as Tulasi); Jalandhara (as Vrinda)

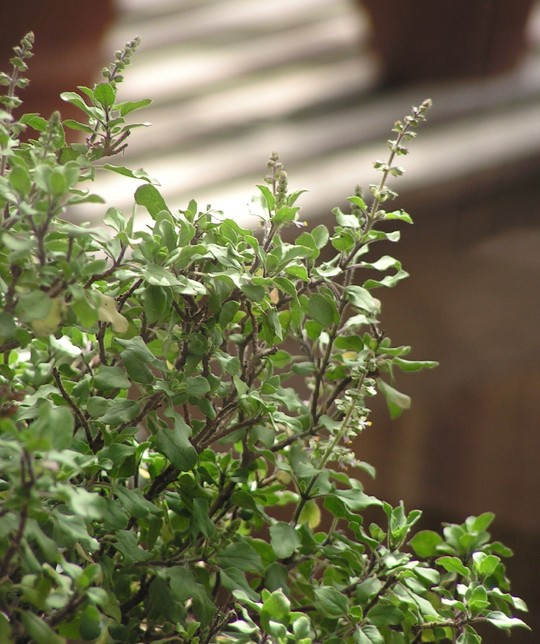
Holy basil plant that represents Tulasi.

Tulasi (Sanskrit: तुलसी, romanized: Tulasī), Tulsi or Vrinda (holy basil) is a sacred plant in Hindu tradition. Hindus regard the plant as an earthly manifestation of the goddess Tulasi; she is regarded as the avatar of Lakshmi, and thus the consort of the god Vishnu. In another iteration, as Vrinda, she is married to Jalandhara. The offering of its leaves is recommended in ritualistic worship of Vishnu and his avatars, like Krishna and Vithoba.

Traditionally, the tulasi is planted in the center of the central courtyard of Hindu houses. The plant is cultivated for religious purposes, and for its essential oil.

== Nomenclature ==
In the Vedas, Tulasi ("matchless") is known as Vaishnavi ("belonging to Vishnu"), Vishnu Vallabha ("beloved of Vishnu"), Haripriya ("beloved of Vishnu"), Vishnu Tulasi. The Tulasi with green leaves is called Shri-Tulasi ("fortunate Tulasi") or Lakshmi-Tulasi; Shri is also a synonym for Lakshmi, Vishnu's spouse. This variety is also known as Rama-Tulasi ("bright Tulasi"); Rama is also one of the principal avatars of Vishnu. The Tulasi with dark green or purple leaves and purple stem is called Shyama-Tulasi ("dark Tulasi") or Krishna-Tulasi ("dark Tulasi"); Krishna is also a prominent avatar of Vishnu. This variety is considered especially sacred to Krishna, as its purple color is similar to Krishna's dark complexion.

One argument mooted is that goddess Lakshmi is also identical with Tulasi and hence it is also known as Lakshmi Priya ("beloved Lakshmi"). Tulasi is also identified with the wives of other incarnations of Vishnu, such as of Rama and Krishna.

The name Tulasi is also believed to literally translate as "immeasurable". Tula means a scale or balance, where an item is place on one side and weights on the other to compare and measure the weight. Hence, Tulasi could also mean the one who cannot be measured or compared.

== Legends ==
=== Lakshmi-Tulasi ===
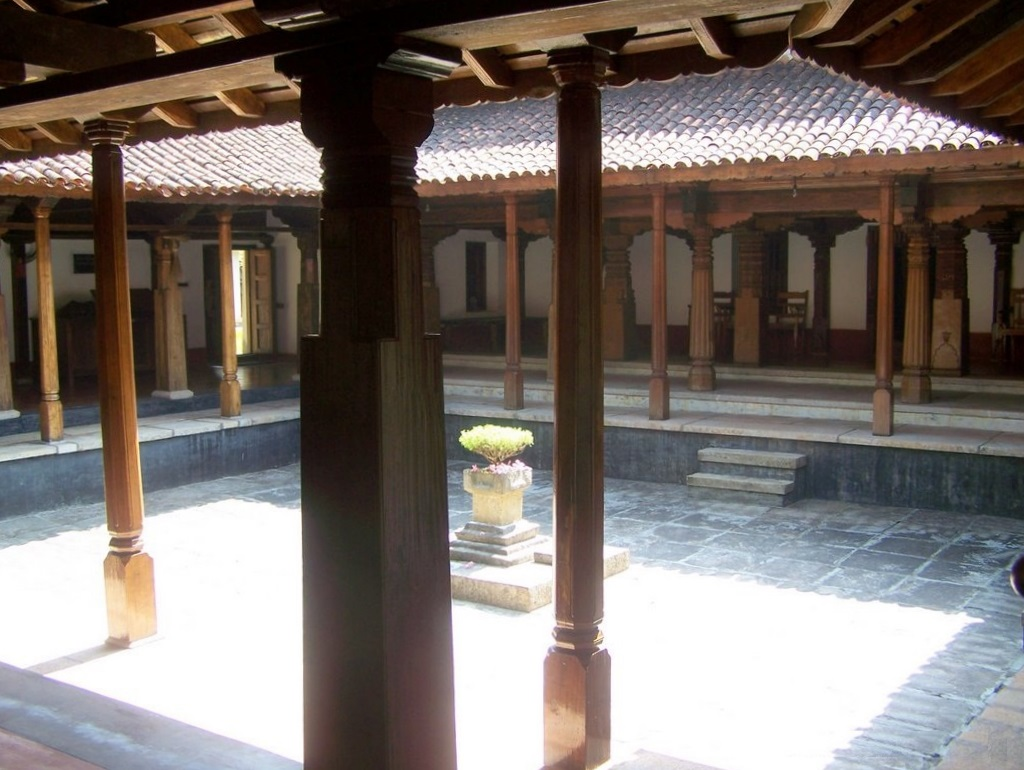
An altar with tulasi plant for daily worship in a courtyard in India

The Devi Bhagavata Purana regards Tulasi as a manifestation of Lakshmi, the goddess of wealth and prosperity, and the principal consort of Vishnu. Once upon a time, King Vrishadhvaja—a devotee of the god Shiva—banned worship of all other deities except for that of his patron god. The agitated sun god, Surya, cursed him that he would be abandoned by Lakshmi. Upset, Shiva pursued Surya, who fled, finally seeking shelter with Vishnu. Vishnu said to the deities that years had passed on earth. Vrishadhvaja and also his heir-son were dead and his grandchildren—Dharmadhvaja and Kushadhvaja—were now worshiping Lakshmi to gain her favor. Lakshmi rewarded their efforts by being born as their daughters Tulasi to Dharmadhvaja, and Vedavati to Kushadhvaja, respectively. In time, Tulasi gave up all her royal comforts, and went to Badrinath to perform a penance to gain Vishnu as her husband. The god Brahma was pleased with her penance, but told her that she would have to marry the daitya Shankhacuda (The reincarnation of Sridama, a devotee of Krishna) before she could marry Vishnu. Shankhacuda is regarded as an Aṃśāvatāra of Vishnu.

==== The Curse of Tulasi ====
Shankhacuda, a mighty daitya, underwent a severe tapasya that pleased Brahma. He was granted the Viṣṇukavaca (the armour of Vishnu), and was blessed with another boon: As long as the Viṣṇukavaca was on his body, no one could slay him. Shankhacuda and Tulasi were soon married. His arrogance caused conflict with the devas, who petitioned Vishnu to relieve them. Vishnu granted his trishula to Shiva, who slew Shankachuda with the weapon. Vishnu appeared in the form of Shankacuda to Tulasi, and the two sported, and ceased when Tulasi realised that he was an imposter. When she jumped to curse him, Vishnu appeared as his true form and spoke to her, after which Tulasi joined him to depart to Vaikuntha:

You have been doing penance for a long time to get me as your husband. Your husband Śaṅkhacūḍa was the chief of my Pārṣadas, Sudāmā. It is time for him to go back to Goloka getting himself released from the curse. By this time Śiva would have killed him and he would have gone to Goloka as Sudāmā. You can now abandon your body and come with me to Vaikuṇṭha to enjoy life as my wife. Your body will decay and become a holy river named Gaṇḍakī; your hair will become the Tulasī plant, the leaves of which will be held sacred in all the three worlds.

— Devi Bhagavata Purana, Skandha 9

In regional variations of this legend, Tulasi, in her anger and grief at her husband's demise, cursed Vishnu to be turned into stone. Vishnu turned into a stone, and resided on riverbank Gandaki River. The devotees of Vishnu call these sacred stones shaligrama.

=== Vrinda ===
The Skanda Purana, Padma Purana, as well as the Shiva Purana feature Tulasi in the tale of Vrinda and her husband, Jalandhara. Vrinda is the daughter of Kalanemi, an asura. Vrinda is described to be pious, and a great devotee of god Vishnu. Jalandhara, an asura born from Shiva's rage, marries her. Angered by the outcome of the Samudra Manthana, Jalandhara wages a successful war on the devas, conquering Svarga, and ruling as a virtuous monarch. However, after hearing details of Parvati's beauty from Narada, he demands Shiva hand her over to him. Infuriated, Shiva declares war on the asura, but finds him to be an invincible foe. After employing his illusory arts, the asura attempts to abduct Parvati in the guise of Shiva. She prays to Vishnu, and makes him realise that the asura was shielded from defeat by the chastity of his wife.

Vrinda receives an ominous nightmare where she sees her husband seated on a buffalo, the sky enveloped in darkness, and a sun without lustre. Terrified of what it implied, she ran from forest to forest, forgetting herself. When a sage rescues her from two rakshasas, she begs him to inform her of the tidings of her husband's battle with Shiva. The sage's disciples produce the asura's hands, a head, and a headless trunk, upon which she falls into despair. She urges the sage to resuscitate her fallen husband, which he does. Witnessing her slain husband return to life, Vrinda sported with him for several days, until she eventually realised his true identity. She cursed Vishnu that his wife, too, would be separated from him (Which happens when Sita is abducted by Ravana) and self-immolates, even as Vishnu attempts to stop her. Her chastity broken, Shiva prevails over Jalandhara.

After the conclusion of the battle, Vishnu is still traumatised by the death of the beautiful Vrinda, and refuses to move from her pyre. The devas invoke Prakriti, the personified force of nature, who offers them three seeds to be planted where Vishnu stays, which represent the sattva, rajas, and tamas gunas. The seeds grow to become three plants, Dhātrī, Mālatī, and Tulasī, who are personified as three women, Svarā, Lakṣmī, and Gaurī. Vishnu grows infatuated by the sight of these wondrous women. Since Mālatī is regarded to be "deceptive" (As she stems from Lakṣmī, who is already Vishnu's shakti), she is condemned. The goddesses of Dhātrī and Tulasī, however, bear genuine love for Vishnu, and make him forget about his misery. They accompany Vishnu to Vaikuntha, and greatly please and delight him.

In a variation of this legend, Vrinda immolates herself in her husband's funeral pyre, but Vishnu ensures that she is incarnated in the form of tulasi plant upon the earth. She gains the status of a goddess named Tulasi, while her earthly form is the tulasi plant.

=== Other Legends ===
A Vaishnava legend relates the origin of the tulasi to the Samudra Manthana, the churning of the cosmic ocean by the devas and the asuras. At the end of the churning, Dhanvantari rose from the ocean with amrita (the elixir of immortality). Vishnu procured it for the devas, when the asuras tried to steal it. Vishnu is regarded to have shed happy tears, the first of which fell in amrita, and formed the tulasi.

In many folk narratives, no sexual intercourse occurs; instead, her chastity is considered broken simply by looking at Vishnu as she would look at her husband, or by touching his feet in the manner reserved for her husband.

== Worship ==
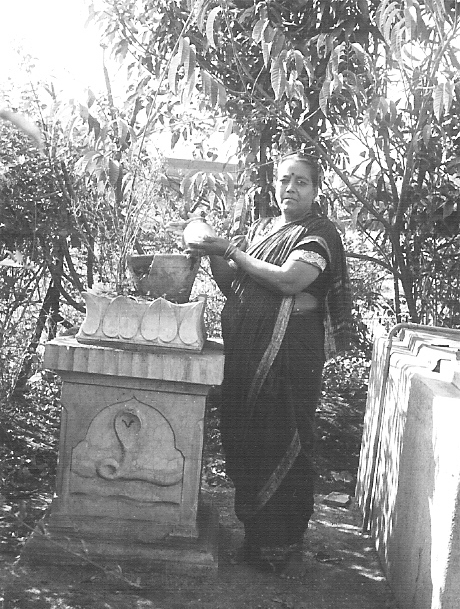
A woman from Maharashtra watering tulasi in 1970s

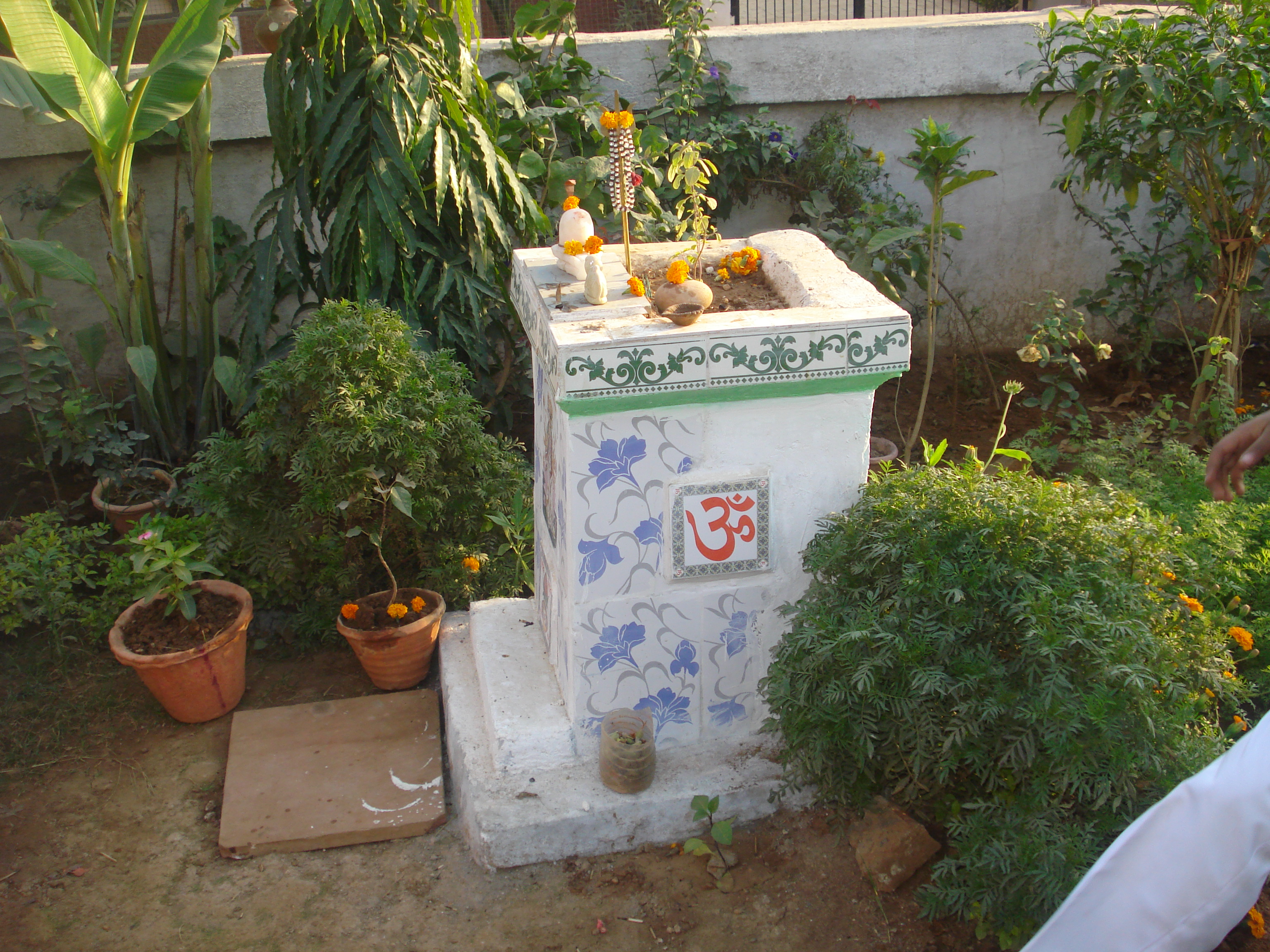
A Tulasi Vrindavan in a house in Gwalior

=== Provenance ===
Tulasi has been used for its therapeutic properties since circa 5000–4000 BCE. In the Rig Veda, Tulasi is mentioned and that is generally dated around to 1500 BCE.

Prakash and Gupta (2011: p. 2) assert that:

Tulasi has been used in India for around 5000 years and is acclaimed for its healing properties of the mind, body and spirit.

Prakash and Gupta (2011) also cite various ancient scriptures and texts that mention the religious and medicinal significance of Tulasi, such as: the Rigveda, the Padmapurana, the Brahmavaivarta Purana, the Skanda Purana, and the Charaka Samhita.

=== General worship ===
While tree worship is not uncommon in Hinduism, the tulasi plant is regarded as the holiest of all plants. The tulasi plant is regarded as a threshold point between heaven and earth. A traditional prayer narrates that the creator-god Brahma resides in its branches, all Hindu pilgrimage centres reside in its roots, the Ganges flows within its roots, all deities are in its stem and its leaves, and that the most sacred Hindu texts, the Vedas are found in the upper part of the holy basil's branches. The tulasi herb is a centre of household religious devotion particularly among women and is referred to as the "women's deity" and "a symbol of wifehood and motherhood", it is also called "the central sectarian symbol of Hinduism" and Vaishnavas consider it as "the manifestation of god in the plant kingdom".

The tulasi plant is grown in or near several Hindu houses, especially by Brahmins and other Hindu varnas of the Vaishnava sect. A house with a tulasi plant is sometimes considered a place of pilgrimage. The sacred groves where these herbs are grown are also known as Vrindavana (grove of Tulasi), a miniaturised Vrindavan is a raised cuboid stone or brick structure often in middle of the house's courtyard or in front of the house.

A person who waters and cares for the tulasi daily is believed to gain spiritual merit and the divine grace of Vishnu, even if he does not worship it. Traditionally, the daily worship and care of the plant is the responsibility of the women of the household. Though daily worship is prescribed, Tuesdays and Fridays are considered especially sacred for Tulasi worship. Rituals involve watering the plant, cleaning the area near the plant with water and cow dung and making offerings of food, flowers, incense, Ganges water, etc. Rangoli (decorative designs) of deities and saints are drawn near its foot. Devotees pray to Tulasi and circumambulate the plant while chanting mantras. The tulasi plant is often worshipped twice in a day: in the morning and in the evening, when a lamp or candle is lit near the plant.

In the 19th century, some families in Bengal regarded the plant as their spiritual guide or clan deity. In a British Indian census, North-Western Provinces recorded themselves as Tulasi worshippers and not belonging to Hindus, Muslims or Sikhs.

In Orissa, on the first day of the Hindu month Vaishakha (April–May), a small vessel with hole at the bottom is filled with water and suspended over the tulasi plant with a steady stream of water, for the entire month. In this period, when a hot summer reigns, one who offers cool water to tulasi, or an umbrella to shelter it from the intense heat is believed to be cleansed of all sin. The stream of water also conveys wishes for a good monsoon.

=== Tulasi Vivaha ===
A ceremony known as Tulasi Vivaha is performed by the Hindus between Prabodhini Ekadashi (eleventh lunar day of the waxing moon of Kartika) to Kartik Poornima (full moon in Kartika), usually on the eleventh or the twelfth lunar day. It is the ceremonial wedding of the tulasi plant to Vishnu, in the form of his image, Shaligrama, or a Krishna or Rama image. Both the bride and the groom are ritually worshipped and then married as per traditional Hindu wedding rituals. It marks the end of the four-month chaturmasya period, which corresponds to the monsoon and is considered inauspicious for weddings and other rituals, so the day inaugurates the annual marriage season in India.

== Religious traditions ==
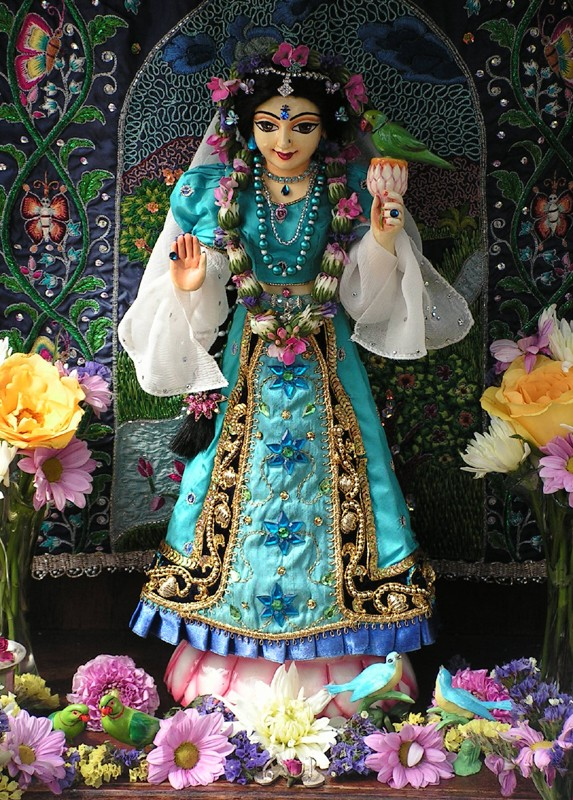
Murti of the goddess

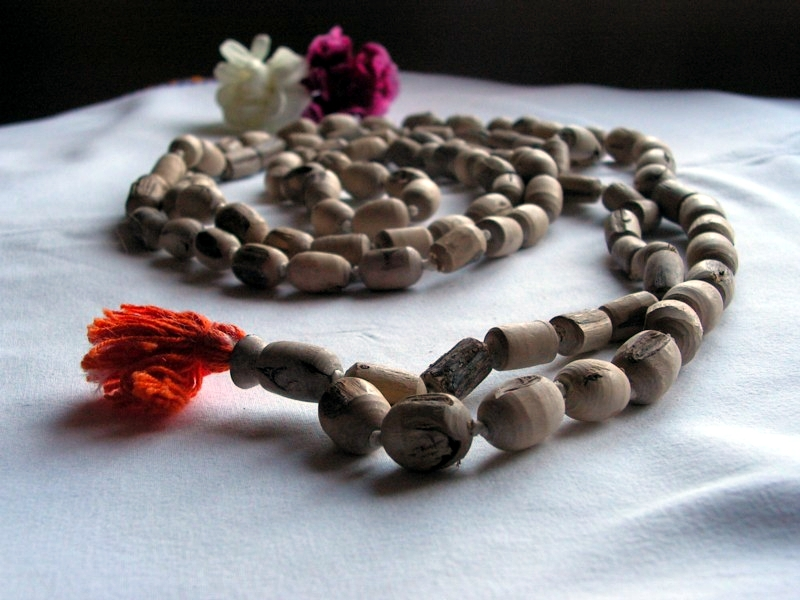
Set of japa mala, made from tulasi wood, with head bead in foreground.

=== Vaishnavism ===
Tulasi is especially sacred in the worship of Vishnu and his forms Krishna and Vithoba and other related Vaishnava deities. Garlands made of 10000 Tulasi leaves, water mixed with Tulasi, food items sprinkled with Tulasi are offered in veneration to Vishnu or Krishna.

Vaishnavas traditionally use japa malas (a string of Hindu prayer beads) made from Tulasi stems or roots called Tulasi malas, which are an important symbol of the initiation. Tulasi malas are considered to be auspicious for the wearer, and believed to connect him with Vishnu or Krishna and confer the protection of the deity. They are worn as a necklace or garland or held in the hand and used as a rosary. Tulasi's great connection with Vaishnavas is communicated with the fact that Vaishnavas are known as "those who bear the tulasi round the neck". Some pilgrims carry tulasi plants in their hands throughout their pilgrimage to Dvaraka, the legendary capital of Krishna and one of the seven most sacred Hindu cities. Different sects consider the use of Tulasi in prayers to deities not related to Vishnu and is incarnations, differently. Some Vaishnavas consider the use of Tulasi for any other deities a sin.

=== Shaivism ===
There are conflicting accounts about Tulasi leaves being used in the worship of the god Shiva. While Bael leaves are often offered to Shiva, some authors note that Tulasi may also be offered to him while others say Tulasi cannot be offered to him at all. Tulasi worship is sometimes regarded the worship of Shiva, conveying the deity's omnipresence. Shiva's aniconic symbol – the linga – is sometimes prescribed to have made from the black soil from the roots of the tulasi plant.

=== Shaktism ===
Tulasi is taboo in worship of the Devi – the supreme goddess, as the pungent aroma of the tulasi plant is believed to anger her.

=== Miscellaneous ===
It is also not allowed for the worship of Hanuman as he is celibate and Tulasi is regarded as a goddess.

In Orissa, the tulasi plant represents all local deities and rituals to propitiate them are offered in front of the plant.

The Nayars of Malabar offer tulasi plants to pacify evil spirits.

== Importance ==
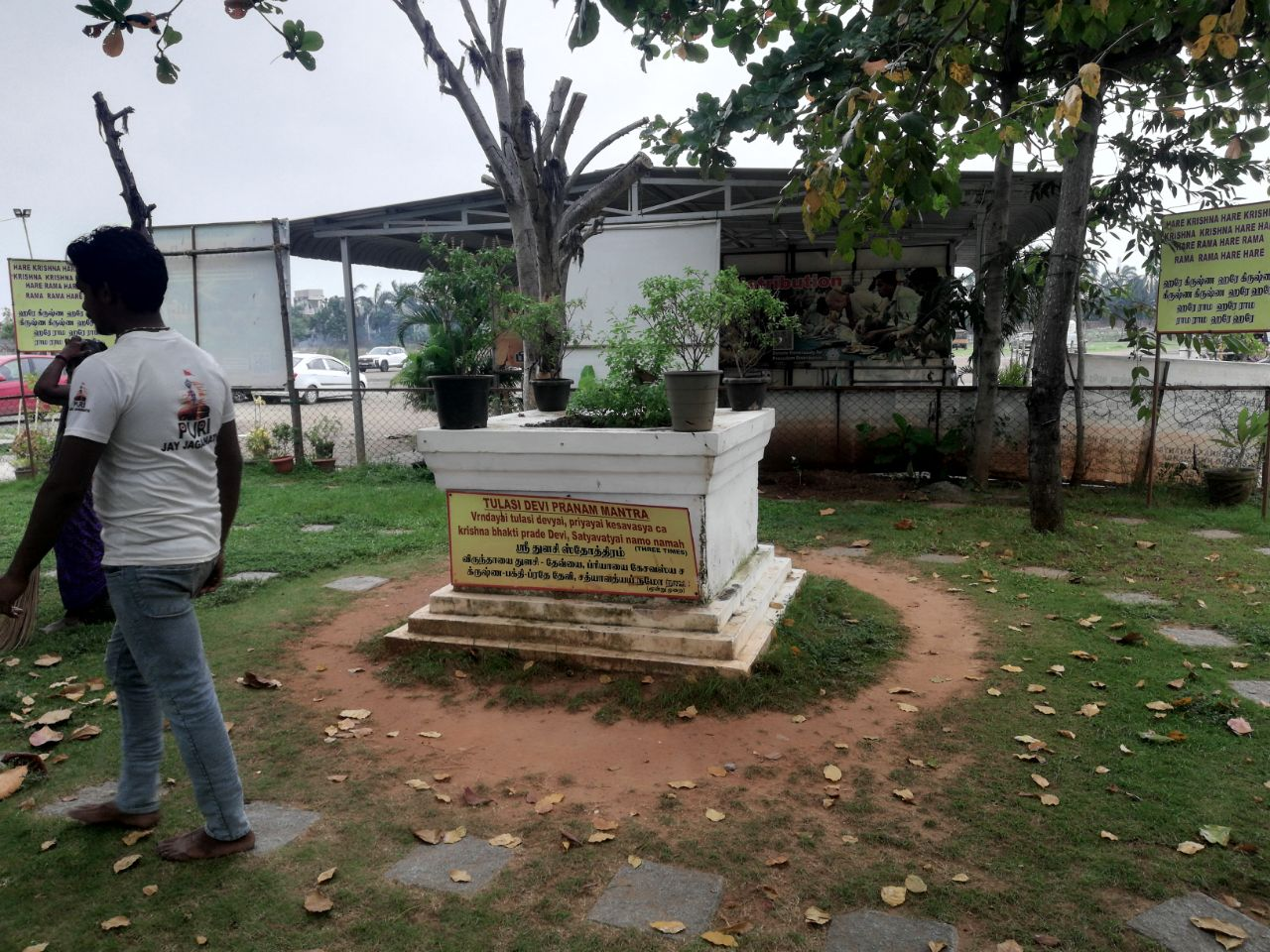
Divotees circumambulating a Tulasi Maadam at the ISKCON Temple in Chennai

In the Srimad Bhagavatam, the significance of the Tulasi over other plants is described as:

Although flowering plants like the mandāra, kunda, kurabaka, utpala, campaka, arṇa, punnāga, nāgakeśara, bakula, lily and pārijāta are full of transcendental fragrance, they are still conscious of the austerities performed by tulasī, for tulasī is given special preference by the Lord, who garlands Himself with tulasī leaves

— Srimad Bhagavatam, Canto 4, Chapter 15, Verse 19

Every part of the tulasi plant is revered and considered sacred, including the leaves, stem, flower, root, seeds and oil. Even the soil around the plant is holy. The Padma Purana declares a person who is cremated with tulasi twigs in his funeral pyre gains moksha and a place in Vishnu's abode Vaikuntha. If a tulasi stick is used to burn a lamp for Vishnu, it is like offering the deities lakhs of lamps. If one makes a paste of dried tulasi wood (from a plant that died naturally) and smears it over his body and worships Vishnu, it is worth several ordinary pujas and lakhs of gaudanam (donation of cows). Water mixed with the tulasi leaves is given to the dying to raise their departing souls to heaven.

Just as tulasi respect is rewarding, her contempt attracts the wrath of Vishnu. Precautions are taken to avoid this. It is taboo to urinate, excrete or throw waste water near the plant. Uprooting and cutting branches of the plant is prohibited. When the plant withers, the dry plant is immersed in a water body with due religious rites as is the custom for broken divine images, which are unworthy for worship. Though tulasi leaves are necessary for Hindu worship, there are strict rules for it. A prayer of forgiveness may also be offered to Tulasi before the act.

The word Tulasi is used in many place names and family names.

== Tulasi Pujan Diwas ==
Asaram Bapu started Tulasi Pujan Diwas on 25 December 2014. This event should not be mistaken for Tulasi Vivaha, which is observed by Hindus on days between Kartika Ekadashi to Kartik Purnima.

== Bibliography ==
- Littleton, C. Scott (2005). Gods, Goddesses, And Mythology, Volume 11. Marshall Cavendish. pp. 1124–26. ISBN 9780761475590.
- Simoons, Frederick J. (1998). Plants of life, plants of death. Univ of Wisconsin Press. pp. 7–40. ISBN 978-0-299-15904-7.
- Mani, Vettam (1975). Puranic Encyclopaedia: a Comprehensive Dictionary with Special Reference to the Epic and Puranic Literature. Motilal Banarsidass Publishers. p. 797. ISBN 978-0-8426-0822-0.
- Deshpande, Aruna (2005). India: A Divine Destination. Crest Publishing House. p. 203. ISBN 81-242-0556-6.
- Dalal, Roshen (1998). Hinduism: An Alphabetical Guide. Penguin Books India. p. 424. ISBN 9780143414216.
