= Tulasi Vivaha =

Hindu religious occasion

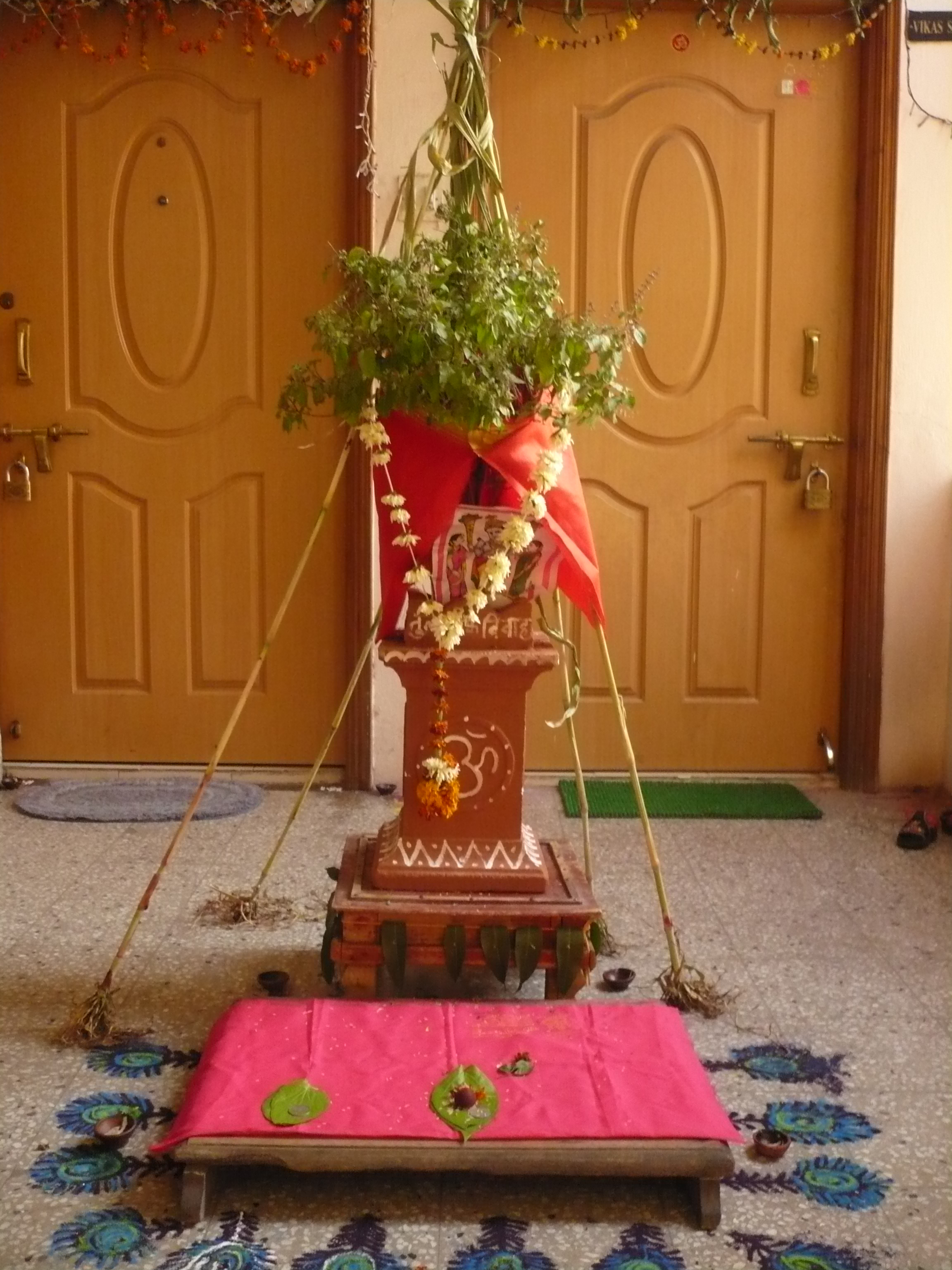
- Tulasi Vivaha ceremony
- Observed by: Hindus
- Type: Religious
- Significance: Commemorates the sacred union of devotion and divine grace.
- Celebrations: Ceremonial wedding
- Date: Kartik Shukla Dwadashi
- Frequency: Annual

Tulasi Vivaha (Sanskrit: तुलसी विवाह, romanized: romanized: Tulasī Vivāha, Gujarati: તુલસી વિવાહ, Kannada: ತುಳಸಿ ಮದುವೆ, romanized: Tulasi Maduve, Telugu: తులసి కళ్యాణం, romanized: Tulasi Kaḷyāṇaṁ, Malayalam: തുളസി കല്യാണം, romanized: Tuḷasi kalyaṇam, Tamil: துளசி கல்யாணம், romanized: Tulasi Kaḷyaṇam, lit. 'Wedding of Tulasi', Marathi: तुळशीचं लग्न, romanized: Tuḷśīca lagna, lit. 'Wedding of Tulasi'), also called Tulasi Kalyanam, is a Hindu ritual, in which a symbolic ceremonial wedding takes place between a tulasi plant or holy basil (the personification of Lakshmi) and a shaligrama or an amla branch (the personifications of Vishnu). Tulasi Vivaha signifies the end of the monsoon, and the beginning of the wedding season in Hinduism.

The ceremonial wedding is performed anytime between Prabodhini Ekadashi (the eleventh or twelfth lunar day of the bright fortnight of the Hindu month of Kartika) and Kartika Purnima (the full moon of the month). The day varies regionally. Followers of the Hindu faith believe that Performing Tulsi Vivah earns religious merit equivalent to Kanyadana.

== Legend ==
Hindu texts such as the Skanda Purana, Padma Purana, as well as the Shiva Purana feature Tulasi in the tale of the asuras, Vrinda and her husband Jalandhara. Vrinda is described as a pious devotee of Vishnu who marries Jalandhara. Due to Vrinda's fidelity, Jalandhara was endowed with power that made him invincible, even by the gods. One day, upon hearing the details of Parvati's beauty from Narada, Jalandhara demands Parvati's husband, Shiva, hand her over to him which leads to a battle between the two. In the midst of the duel, Jalandhara employs his illusory arts, and attempts to abduct Parvati in the guise of Shiva. When Parvati realises his trickery, she escapes and prays to Vishnu that Vrinda also encounters the same fate of deception.

Vrinda has an ominous nightmare where she sees her husband seated on a buffalo. Disturbed, Vrinda attempts to find peace by walking in a park, but is frightened upon seeing two rakshasas. Vishnu, in the guise of a sage, rescues Vrinda and reveals that her husband is dead. She urges the sage to resuscitate her departed husband. Vishnu then deceives Vrinda by taking the guise of her husband, Jalandhara and breaking her chastity. When Vrinda realises this, she curses Vishnu that his wife, too, would be separated from him (as portrayed in the Ramayana, when Sita is separated from Rama) and self-immolates. Her chastity now broken, Shiva is able to defeat Jalandhara.

After the conclusion of the battle, Vishnu is still traumatised by the death of the beautiful Vrinda, and refuses to move from her pyre. The devas invoke Prakriti, the personified force of nature, who offers them three seeds to be planted where Vishnu stays, which represent the sattva, rajas, and tamas gunas. The seeds grow to become three plants, Dhātrī, Mālatī, and Tulasī, who are personified as three women, Svarā, Lakṣmī, and Gaurī. Vishnu is infatuated by the sight of these wondrous women. Since Mālatī is regarded to be jealous of Vishnu's shakti (she is born from Lakshmi's divine energy, and the goddess of prosperity herself is also regarded to be Vishnu's divine energy), she is condemned. The goddesses Dhātrī and Tulasī, however, bear genuine love for Vishnu, and make him forget his misery. They accompany Vishnu to Vaikuntha, and greatly please and delight him.

In a variation of this legend, Vrinda immolates herself on her husband's funeral pyre, but Vishnu ensures that she is incarnated in the form of the tulasi plant on earth. She gains the status of a goddess named Tulasi, while her earthly form is the tulasi plant.

In popular tradition, in accordance to a blessing by Vishnu to marry Vrinda in her next birth, Vishnu – in the form of shaligram - married Tulasi on Prabodhini Ekadashi. To commemorate this event, the ceremony of Tulasi Vivaha is performed.

Another minor legend narrates that Lakshmi slew a demon on this day, and remained on earth as the tulasi plant.

A Vaishnava legend relates Tulasi to the Samudra Manthana, the churning of the cosmic ocean by the devas and asuras. At the end of the churning, Dhanvantari rose from the ocean with amrita (the elixir of immortality). Vishnu procures it for the devas, and successfully denies it to the asuras. Vishnu is regarded to have shed happy tears, the first of which fell inside the amrita, and formed Tulasi, who the former married.

== Celebrations ==
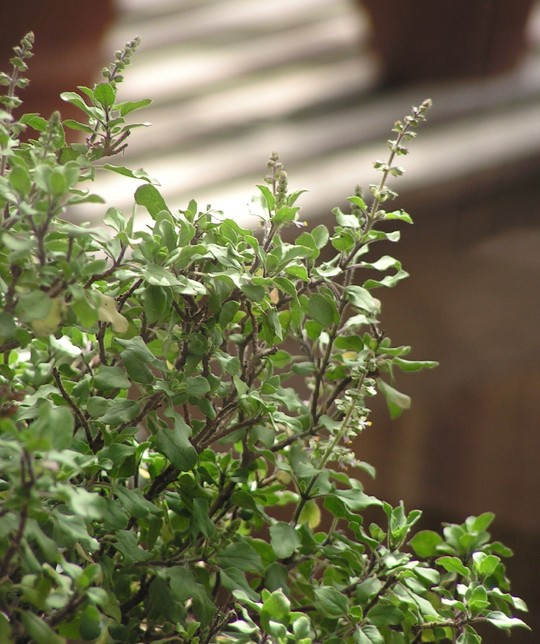
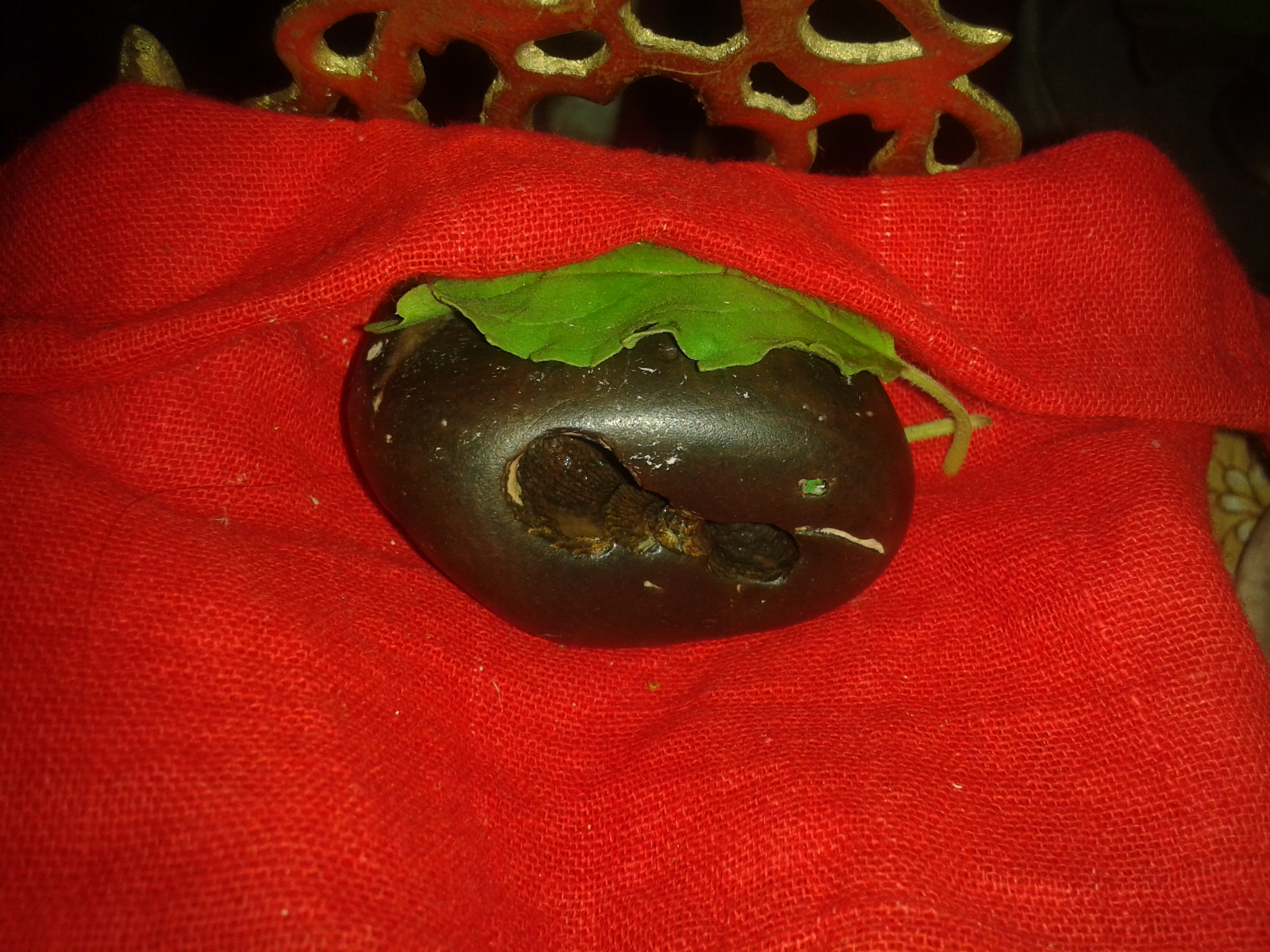
Tulasi and Shaligrama, personifications of Lakshmi Narayana

The wedding ceremony of Tulasi to Vishnu/Krishna resembles the traditional Hindu wedding. The wedding is conducted at homes and in temples where a fast is observed until evening, when the ceremony begins. A mandapam (wedding booth) is built around the courtyard of the house where the tulasi plant is usually planted in centre of the courtyard in a brick plaster called the Tulasi Vrindavana. It is believed that the soul of Vrinda resides in the plant at night and leaves in the morning. The bride Tulasi is adorned with a sari and ornaments including earrings and necklaces. A human paper face with a bindi and nose-ring may be attached to Tulasi. The groom is a brass image or picture of Vishnu, Krishna, Balarama, or more frequently the shaligrama stone - the symbol of Vishnu. The image is clothed in a dhoti. Both Vishnu and Tulasi are bathed and decorated with flowers and garlands before the wedding. The couple is linked with a cotton thread (mala) in the ceremony.

=== India ===
==== Bihar ====
At Prabhu Dham in Saunja, India, the festival is collectively celebrated by whole village which makes it a significant point of attraction. Here it is celebrated as three day festival in the Hindu month of Kartik from Ekadashi to Trayodashi. The festival starts with the Vedic chanting of Ramcharitmanas or Ramayana by the villagers. The second day is celebrated as Sobha Yatra which is of significant importance in which the special prasad is Pongal, and the third day is celebrated as Tilakotsava and Vivahotsava of Vishnu and Vrinda. The villagers prepare 56 types of prasada known as Chapan Bhog and it is distributed to all. All classes participate in this ritual accordingly. Devotees including saints and mahants from all over Bihar visit this place to celebrate this festive occasion.

==== Maharashtra ====
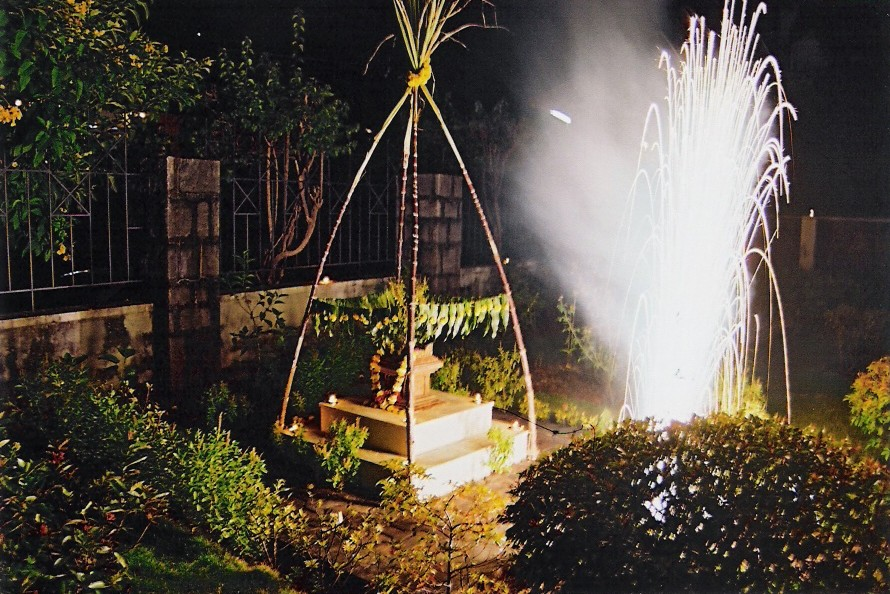
Tulasi plant worshipped as part of Tulasi Vivaha celebrations.

In Maharashtra, an important ritual in the ceremony is when the white cloth is held between the bride and the groom and the priest recites the Mangal Ashtaka mantras. These mantras formally complete the wedding. Rice mixed with vermilion is showered by the attendees on Tulasi and Vishnu at the end of the recitation of the mantras with the word "Savadhan" (literally "be careful" implying "You are united now". The white curtain is also removed. The attendees clap signifying approval to the wedding. Vishnu is offered sandalwood-paste, men's clothing and the sacred thread. The bride is offered saris, turmeric, vermilion and a wedding necklace called Mangal-sutra, worn by married women. Sweets and food cooked for an actual wedding are cooked for Tulasi Vivaha too. This ceremony is mostly performed by women. The prasad of sugar-cane, coconut chips, fruits and groundnut is distributed to devotees.

The expenses of the wedding are usually borne by a daughter-less couple, who act as the parents of Tulasi in the ritual wedding. The giving away of the daughter Tulasi (kanyadaan) to Krishna is considered meritorious to the couple. The bridal offerings to Tulasi are given to a Brahmin priest or female ascetics after the ceremony.

==== Gujarat ====
In two Rama temples in Saurashtra, the ceremony is more elaborate. An invitation card is sent to the groom's temple by the bride's temple. On Prabodhini Ekadashi, a barat (bridal procession) of Lalji - an image of Vishnu - sets off to the bride's temple. Lalji is placed in a palanquin and accompanied by singing and dancing devotees. The barat is welcomed on the outskirts of Tulsi's village and the ceremonial wedding is held at the temple. On the bride's side, Tulasi is planted in an earthen pot for the ceremony. People desirous of children perform Kanyadaan from Tulsi's side acting as her parents. Bhajans are sung throughout the night and in the morning the barat of Lalji returns to his village with Tulasi.

==== Andhra Pradesh and Telangana ====
Tulasi Kaḷyāṇaṁ (తులసి కళ్యాణం) is mainly celebrated on Kartika Shukla Dvadashi (the 12th day of the Kartika month's waxing moon phase) or Utthana Dwadashi or Ksheerabdhi Dwadashi among the Telugus. Vishnu is worshipped in the form of an amla plant. A branch of the amla tree is placed in the Tulasi Vrindavan. Tulasi is decorated like a bride, complete with jewellery. A puja is performed with the Shodashopachara, which is sometimes substituted with other forms of Upachara.

== See also ==
- Tulasi in Hinduism
- Tulasi Pujan Divas
- Tulasi Vrindavana
