= Shayani Ekadashi =

Hindu occasion

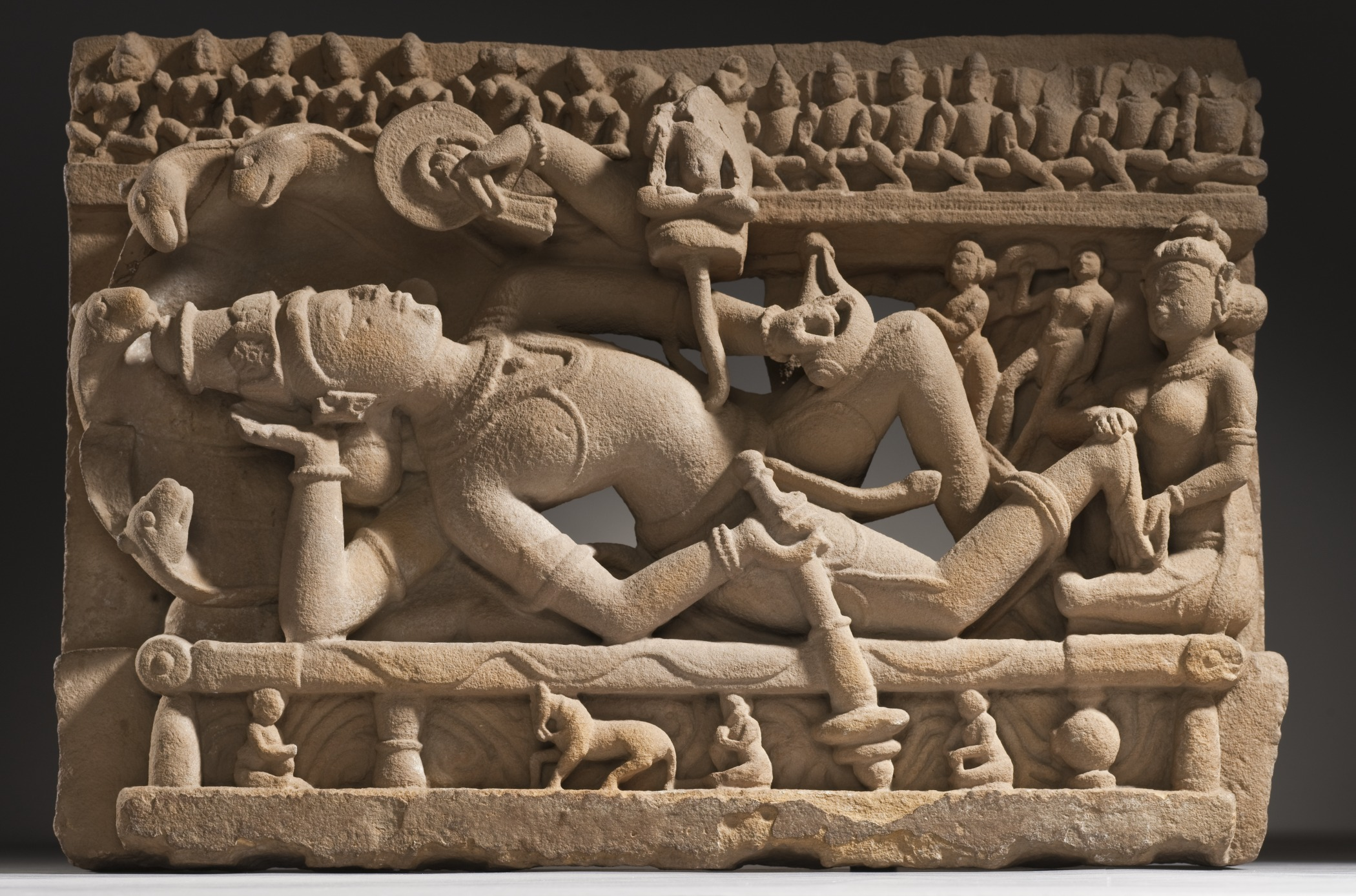
- Sculpture of Vishnu sleeping upon his celestial serpent, Shesha
- Also called: Maha-Ekadashi
- Observed by: Hindus, especially Vaishnavas
- Type: Hindu
- Significance: Beginning of the Chaturmasya
- Observances: Prayers and religious rituals, including puja to Vishnu; Pandharpur Yatra
- Date: 11th day of the full moon in the month of Ashadha
- Duration: 1 1/2 day
- Frequency: Annual
- Related to: Prabodhini Ekadashi

Shayani Ekadashi (Sanskrit: शयनी एकादशी, romanized: Śayanī Ekādaśī, lit. 'eleventh day of sleep'), also known by various other names, (Note: Maha Ekadashi, Ashadhi Ekadashi, Harishayani Ekadashi, and Devashayani Ekadashi) is the eleventh lunar day (Ekadashi) of the bright fortnight (Shukla Paksha) of the Hindu month of Ashadha (June - July). This occasion is holy to Vaishnavas, the followers of the Hindu preserver deity, Vishnu, as it is regarded to be the day the deity's sleep commences.

== Significance ==
On this day images of Lord Vishnu and Lakshmi are worshipped, the night is spent singing prayers, and devotees fast and take vows on this day, to be observed during the entonth period of rainy season. These may include, giving up a food item or fasting on every Ekadashi day.

It is believed that Vishnu falls asleep in Kshira Sagara - the cosmic ocean of milk - on Shesha, the cosmic serpent. Vishnu finally awakens from his slumber four months later on Prabodhini Ekadashi - eleventh day of bright fortnight in the Hindu month Kartika (October–November). This period is known as Chaturmasya (lit. "four months") and coincides with the rainy season. Shayani Ekadashi is the beginning of the Chaturmasya. Devotees start observing the Chaturmasya vrata (vow) to please Vishnu on this day.

A fast is observed on Shayani Ekadashi. The fast demands abstinence from all grains, beans, and cereals, as well as certain vegetables, including onions and certain spices.

== Legend ==
In the Bhavishyottara Purana, Krishna narrates significance of Shayani Ekadashi to Yudhishthira, as the creator-god Brahma narrated the significance to his son Narada once. The story of King Mandata is narrated in this context. The pious king's country had faced drought for three years, but the king was unable to find a solution to please the rain gods. Eventually, sage Angiras advised the king to observe the vrata (vow) of Devashayani Ekadashi. On doing so, by the grace of Vishnu, there was rain in the kingdom.

== Pandharpur Yatra ==
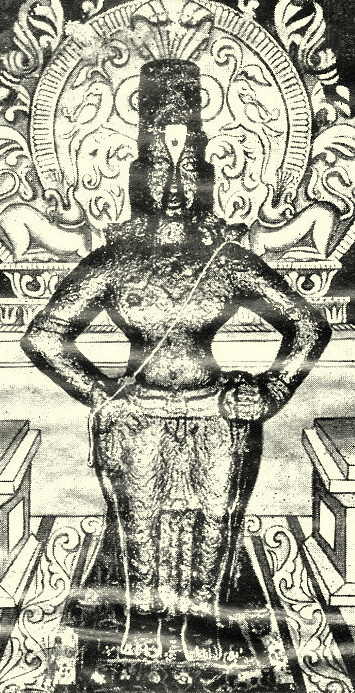
The image of Vitthala at Pandharpur.

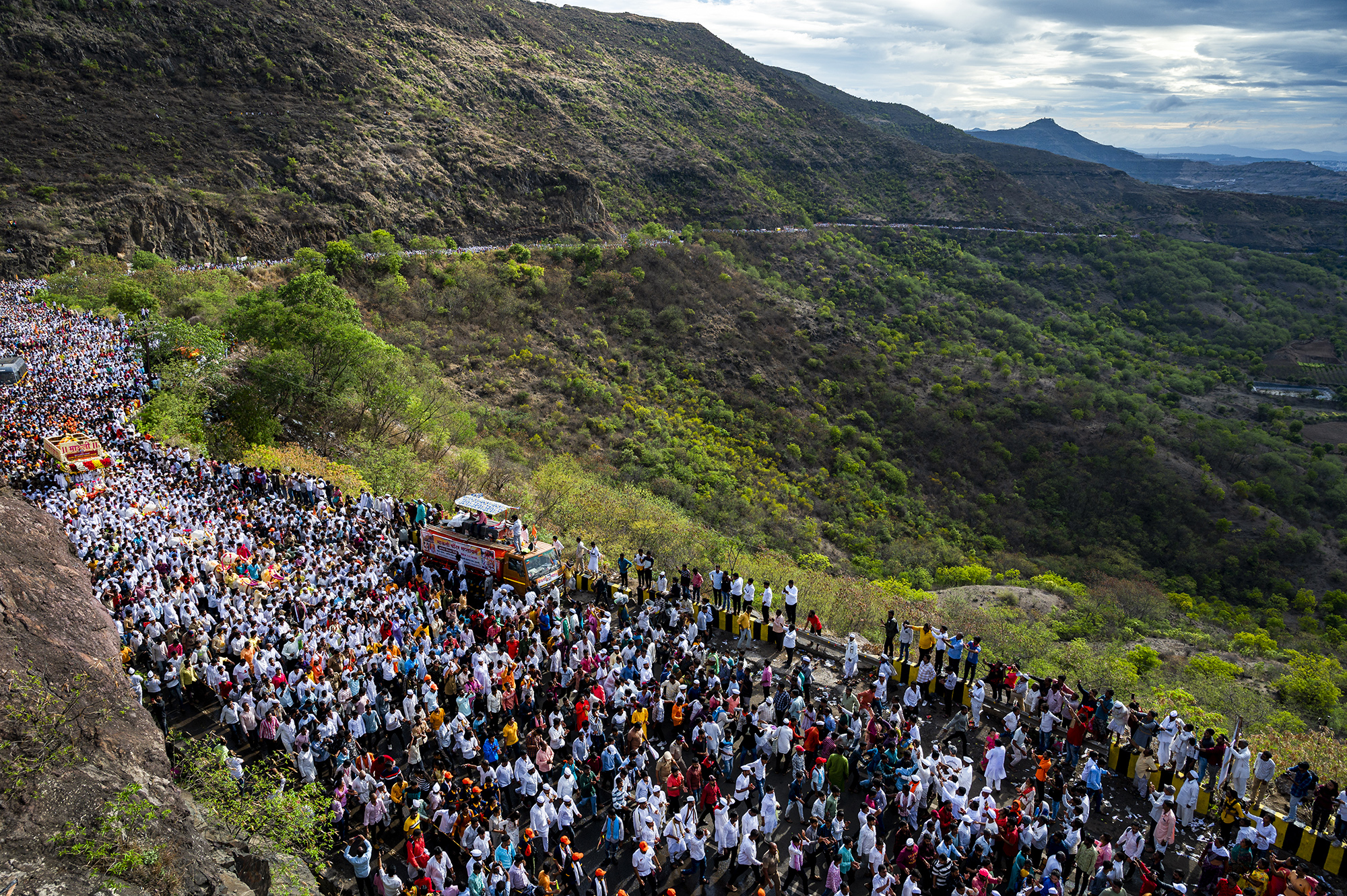
Thousands taking part in Ashadhi Vari (Warkari) the annual Hindu religious padayatra at Dive Ghat, Maharashtra, 2022

This day, a huge yatra or religious procession of pilgrims known as Pandharpur Ashadi Ekadasi Waari Yatra culminates at Pandharpur, in Solapur district in south Maharashtra, situated on the banks of the Chandrabhaga River. Pandharpur is main center of worship of the deity Vitthala, a local form of Vishnu. Lakhs (hundreds of thousands) of pilgrims come to Pandharpur on this day from different parts of Maharashtra. Some of them carry Palkhis (palanquins) with the images of the saints of Maharashtra. Dnyaneshwar's image is carried from Alandi, Namdev's image from Narsi Namdev, Tukaram's from Dehu, Eknath's from Paithan, Nivruttinath's from Trimbakeshwar, Muktabai's from Muktainagar, Sopan's from Sasvad and Gajanan Maharaj's from Shegaon. These pilgrims are referred to as Warkaris. They sing Abhangas (chanting hymns) of Saint Tukaram and Saint Dnyaneshwar, dedicated to Vitthala.
