= Kartika Purnima =

Hindu, Jain and Sikh holy day

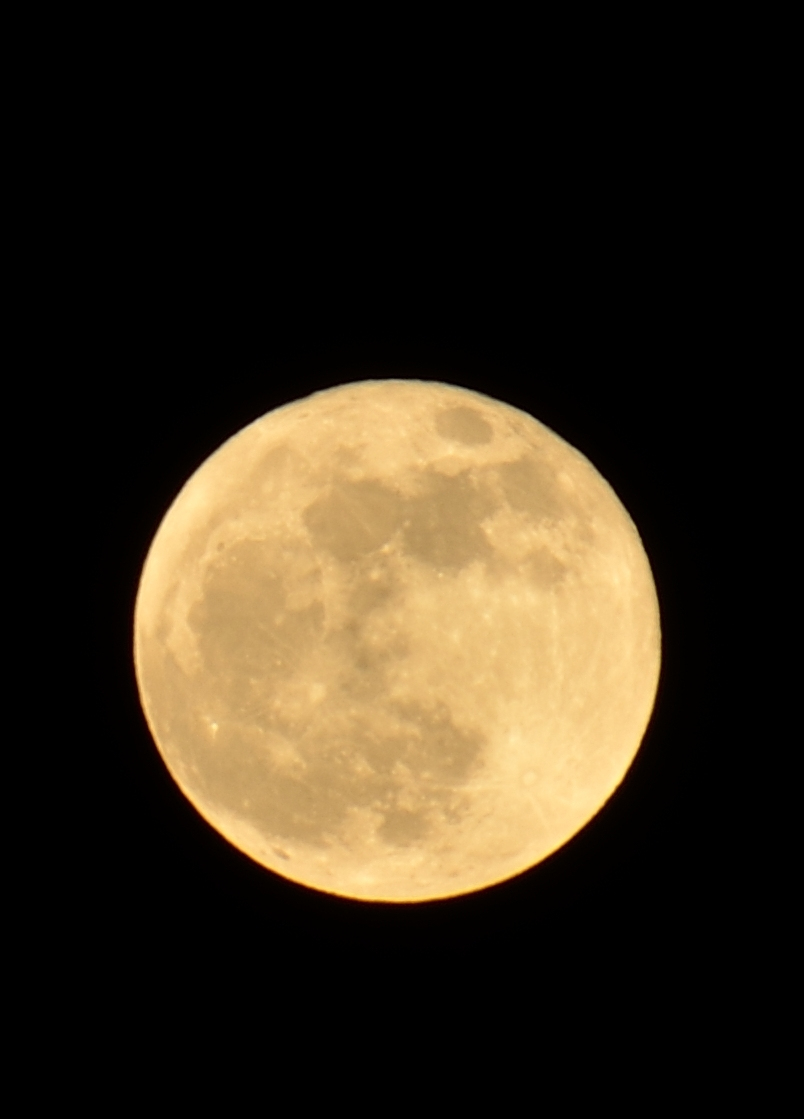
- Kartika Purnima: 28 November 2012
- Also called: Kartika Pournami, Tripuri Purnima, Tripurari Purnima, Deva-Diwali, Deva-Deepawali
- Observed by: Hindus, Sikhs, and Jains
- Type: Religious
- Significance: Commemorates as : Lord Shiva's victory over the demon Tripurasura; Appearance of Bhagavan Vishnu as Matsya (the fish avatar); Birthday of Lord Kartikeya, and Vrinda; Birth of Guru Nanak
- Observances: Prayers and religious rituals honoring Brahma at Pushkar Lake, puja to Vishnu and Harihara, Bathing at Pushkar Lake and puja to Brahma
- Date: full moon day or the 15th day in the Hindu month of Kartika
- Related to: Vaikuntha Chaturdashi

Kartika Purnima (Sanskrit: कार्त्तिक पूर्णिमा, romanized: Kārttikapūrṇimā), also known as Kartika Pournami, is a Hindu, Sikh, and Jain cultural festival that is celebrated on purnima (full moon day), the 15th day of the lunar month Kartika. It falls in November or December of the Gregorian calendar and is also known as Tripurari Purnima or Deva-Deepavali, the gods festival of lights.

== Significance ==
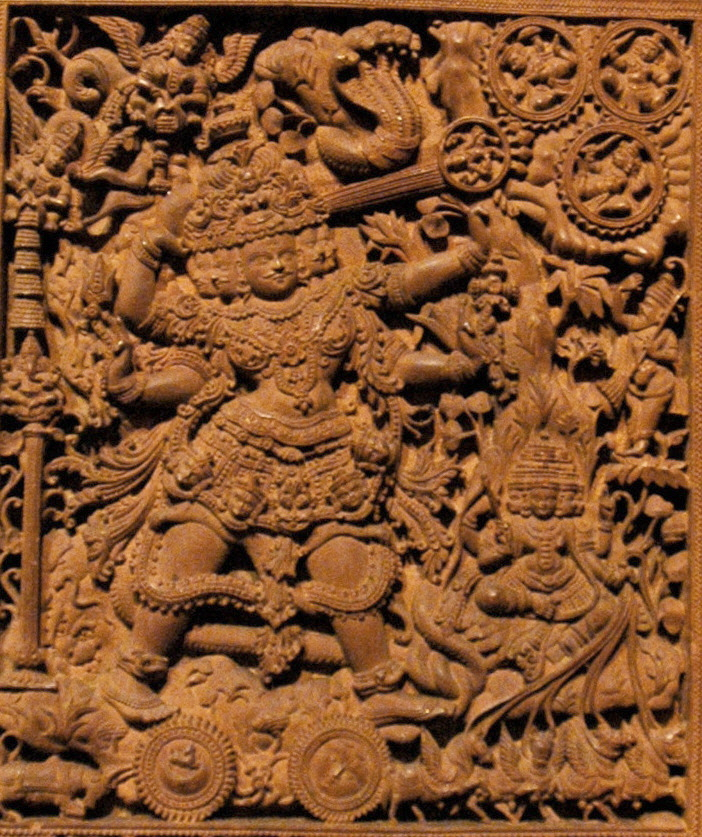
Here, the five-headed Tripurantaka is seen pointing an arrow towards the Tripura (rightmost top corner) with the bow made of Mount Meru and the serpent Vasuki as its string. The four-headed god Brahma is seen, and the Moon and the Sun are depicted as the wheels of the chariot.

=== Radha-Krishna ===
In Vaishnavite tradition, this day is considered significant and special for the worship of both Radha and Krishna. It is believed that on this day, Radha-Krishna performed rasalila with their gopis. At Jagannath Temple, Puri and all other Radha-Krishna temples, a sacred vow is observed throughout Kartika month, and performances of raaslila are organized on the day of Kartika Purnima. According to Brahma Vaivarta Purana, Krishna worshipped Radha on this day.

=== Shiva ===
'Tripuri Purnima' or 'Tripurari Purnima' derives its name from Tripurari – the foe of the demon Tripurasura. In some legends of Kartika Purnima, the term is used to denote the three demon sons of Tārakāsura. Tripurari is an epithet of the god Shiva. Shiva, in his form as Tripurantaka (lit. 'Killer of Tripurasura'), killed Tripurasura on this day. Tripurasura had conquered the whole world and defeated the gods and also created three cities in space, together called "Tripura". The killing of the demon(s) and destruction of his/their cities with a single arrow by Shiva overjoyed the gods, and they declared the day as a festival of illuminations. This day is also called "Deva-Diwali"—the Diwali of the gods.

=== Tulasi and Vishnu ===
Kartika Purnima is also celebrated as the manifestation day of Matsya, the god Vishnu's fish incarnation (avatar) and Vrinda, the personification of the tulasi. In the Brahma Vaivarta Purana, Tulasi is a gopi cursed to be born on earth as a princess and marry Shankacuda, an asura. She remained a devotee of Vishnu and strongly wished to marry the deity. When Shankacuda threatens the existing order with his conquests, invincible owing to the chastity of his wife, Vishnu assumes his form and tricks her into hugging him, causing her to lose her chastity and allowing Shiva to triumph in his battle over the asura. Vishnu then revealed his true form and married her. Tulasi cursed that Vishnu would take the form of a shaligrama stone for his trickery, and to appease her, the deity stated that her essence would become the tulasi plant and the Gandaki river. Her divine form ascended to Vaikuntha to be with him.

=== Kartikeya ===
In Southern India, Kartika Purnima is also celebrated as the birthday of Kartikeya, the god of war and younger son of Shiva. This day is also dedicated to the pitrs, dead ancestors.

Underhill believes that the origins of this festival may lie in ancient times, when a sacrifice called Shakamedhah was performed to attain victory over enemies.

The festival has even more significance when the day falls in the nakshatra (lunar mansion) of Krittika and is then called Maha Kartika. If the nakshatra is Bharani, the results are stated to be special. If it is Rohini, then the fruitful results are even more. Any philanthropic act on this day is supposed to bring benefits and blessings equal to the performing of ten yajnas.

== Hinduism ==
Kartika Purnima is closely associated with Prabodhini Ekadashi, which marks the end of the chaturmasya, a four-month period when Bhagwan Vishnu is believed to sleep. Prabodhini Ekadashi signifies the awakening of the god. Many fairs that begin on Prabodhini Ekadashi end on Kartika Purnima, Kartika Purnima usually being the most important day of the fair. Fairs that conclude on this day include Prabodhini Ekadashi celebrations at Pandharpur and Pushkar Fair. Kartika Purnima is also the last day to perform the Tulasi Vivaha ceremony, which can be performed from Prabodhini Ekadashi.

Also, it is believed that on this day, Bhagwan Vishnu returns to his abode after completing his stay with king Mahabali, another reason why the day is known as Deva-Diwali.

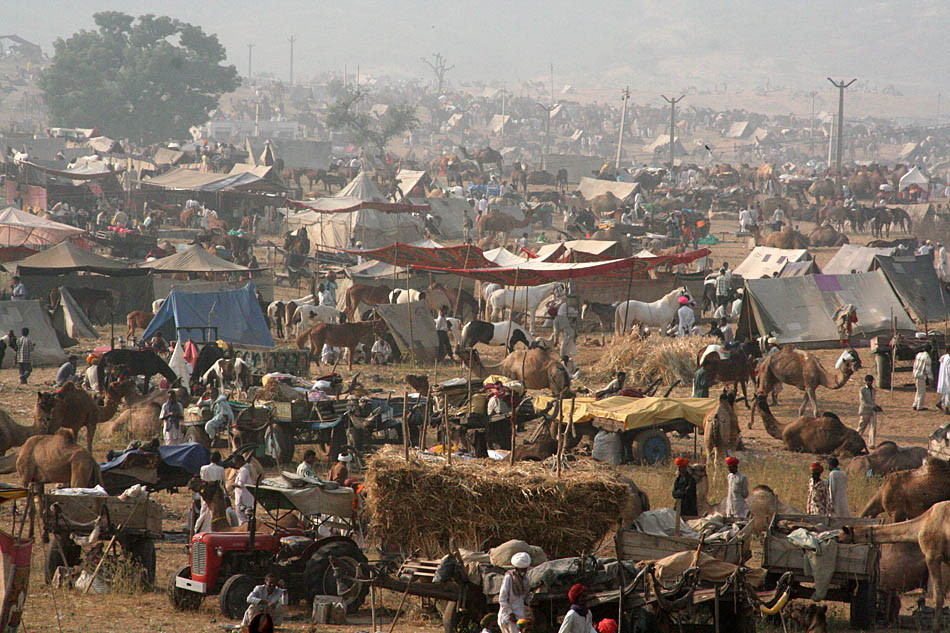
Pushkar Mela, 2006

In Pushkar, Rajasthan, the Pushkar Fair or Pushkar mela commences on Prabodhini Ekadashi and continues till Kartika Purnima, the latter being the most important. This fair is held in honour of the god Brahma, whose temple stands at Pushkar. A ritual bath on Kartika Purnima in the Pushkar Lake is considered to lead one to salvation. It is believed circling the three Pushkars on Kartika Purnima is highly meritorious. Sadhus gather here and stay from Ekadashi to full moon day in caves. About 200,000 people and 25,000 camels assemble in Pushkar for the fair, which is Asia's largest camel fair.

A ritual bath at a tirtha (a sacred water body like a lake or river) at a pilgrimage centre is prescribed on Kartika Purnima. This holy bath is known as "Kartika snana". A holy bath at Pushkar or in the Ganges river, especially at Varanasi is deemed as most auspicious. Kartika Purnima is the most popular day for bathing in the Ganges at Varanasi. The devotees also take a bath in the evening during moonrise and offer worship by way of six prayers such as Shiva sambuti, Satait and so forth.

Annakuta, an offering of food to the deities, is held in temples. People who have taken vows on Ashvin Purnima end them on Kartika Purnima. Bhagwan Vishnu is also worshipped on this day. Any form of violence (himsa) is prohibited on this day. This includes shaving, hair-cutting, cutting of trees, plucking of fruits and flowers, cutting of crops and even sexual intercourse. Charity especially donation of cows, feeding of Brahmins, fasting are religious activities prescribed for Kartika Purnima. Giving gift of gold is said to fulfill all the desires of people.

Tripuri Purnima is only next to Maha Shivaratri amongst festivals dedicated to Bhagwan Shiva worship. To commemorate the killing of Tripurasura, images of Bhagwan Shiva are carried in procession. Temple complexes in southern India are lit up throughout the night. Deepmalas or towers of lights are illuminated in temples. People place 360 or 720 wicks in temples, to secure escape from hell after death. The 720 wicks symbolize the 360 days and nights of the Hindu calendar. In Varanasi, the ghats come alive with thousands of diyas (brightly lit earthen lamps). People gift lamps to priests. The lamps are kept throughout the night in houses and Bhagwan Shiva temples. This day is also known as "Kartika Diparatna" - the jewel of lamps in Kartika. Lights are also floated in miniature boats in rivers. Lights are placed under tulasi, sacred fig, and amla trees. The lights in the water and under trees are believed to help fishes, insects and birds who saw the light to attain salvation.

In Telugu households of Andhra Pradesh and Telangana, Karthika Maasamu (month) is considered very auspicious. The Kartika month starts on the day after Deepavali according to the (amanta tradition). From that day till the end of the month, oil lamps are lit every day. On Karthika Purnima, oil lamps with 365 wicks prepared at home are lit in Shiva temples. Apart from that, Kartika Puranam is read, and fasting is observed till sunset, every day for the whole month. The Swaminarayan Sampradaya also celebrates this day with faith and fervor.

=== Boita Bandana ===
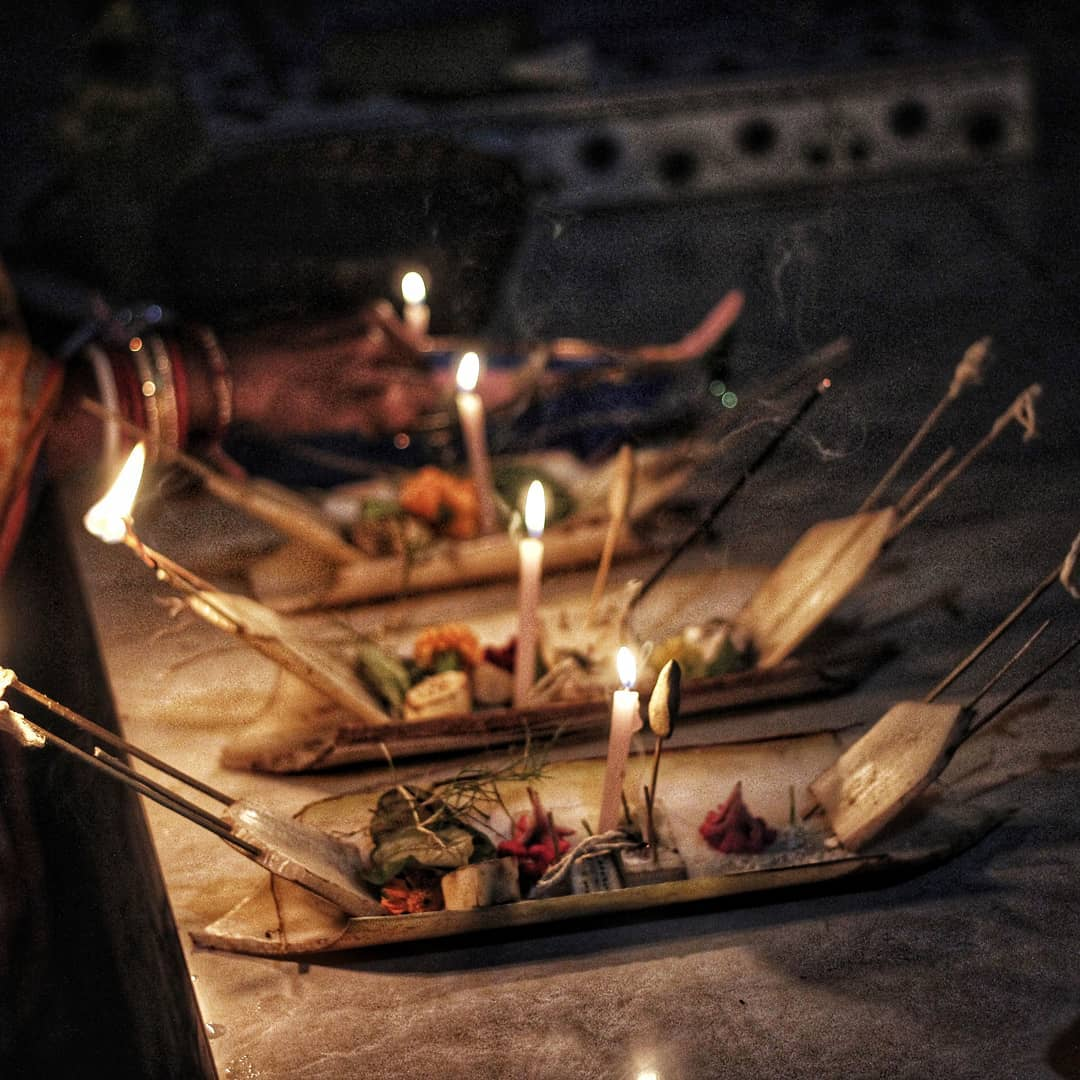
People in Odisha celebrate Kartika Purnima by setting afloat miniature boita (boats) made from banana stem to remember the historical significance of the day.

In Odisha, on Kartika Purnima, people celebrate Boita Bandana (Odia: ବୋଇତ ବନ୍ଦାଣ boita bandāṇa), in memory of ancient maritime trades via Kalinga by heading for the nearest water body to set afloat miniature boats, originally made out of banana stem and coconut stick, lit with Deepak (lamps), fabric, betel leaves. Boita stands for boat or ship. The festival is a mass commemoration of the state's glorious maritime history when it was known as Kalinga and tradesmen and mariners known as sadhabas traveled on boitas to trade with distant island nations that share borders with the Bay of Bengal like Indonesia, Java, Sumatra and Bali.

During Kartika month, the entire Hindu population of Odisha becomes strictly vegetarian. They observe the month with auspicious customs, continuing till the traditional ceremony of Panchuka which falls on the last five days of the month, from Dev Uthni Ekadashi to Kartik Purnima. The ninth day of the brighter half of the month of Kartik is called "Anlā Navami" (Kartik Shukla Paksha Navami) from which the preparations of Panchuka starts. It is also said that these five days of Pachuka are so auspicious that even the crane (in odia- ବଗ) refuses to eat meat. The period of chaturmaasya ends on ekadashi, and with the final day of Kartik month, the full moon night, kick starts the festivities associated with the Margasira month famous for the Gurubaara Laxmi Puja (Margasira Gurubaara, ମାଣବସା ଗୁରୁବାର) in Odisha.

Chhāda Khāi

The Kartika month ends on Kartika Purnima. The day after Kartika Purnima is called Chhada Khai (ଛାଡ଼ ଖାଇ) when non-vegetarians can again start their normal diet. However the exact day depends on what date Chhada Khai occurs, so Odia Hindus can't eat non-vegetarian food on specific days which varies with family custom, the most common being Thursday, on which most families avoid non-vegetarian food, so a suitable day after the completion of Kartik month is chosen which mostly is a Wednesday, Friday or a Sunday occurring after the Kartik Purnima, so Chhada Khai may not fall on the next day of Kartik Purnima.

Kartika Purnima in Odisha also includes the celebration of historic Boita Bandana to commemorate the Bali Jatra commenced by ancient Kalinga merchants and associated fleet to do trade in far South East Asia like Bali, Indonesia etc.

=== Karthika Deepam ===
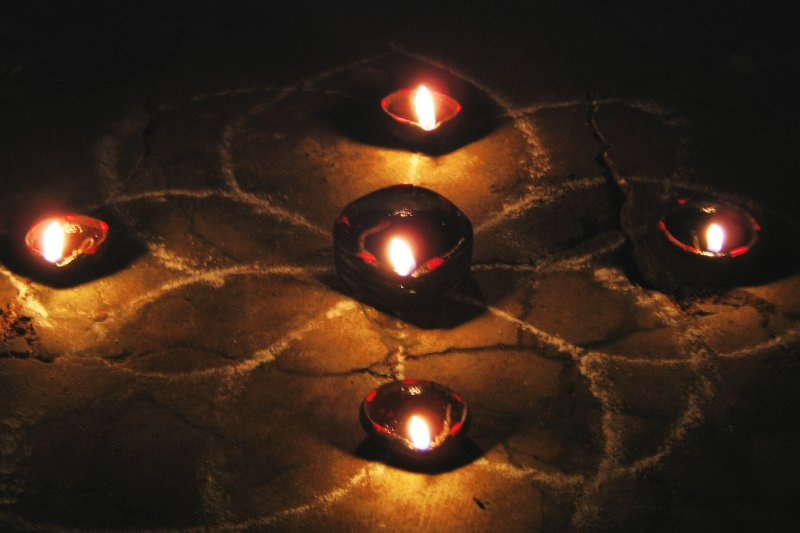
Lamps lit on Karthika Deepam

In Tamil Nadu, Karthika Deepam is celebrated where the Purnima corresponds to the Krittika nakshatra. People light rows of lamps on their balconies. In Tiruvannamalai, a ten-day annual festival is held to celebrate Karthika Deepam.

== Jainism ==
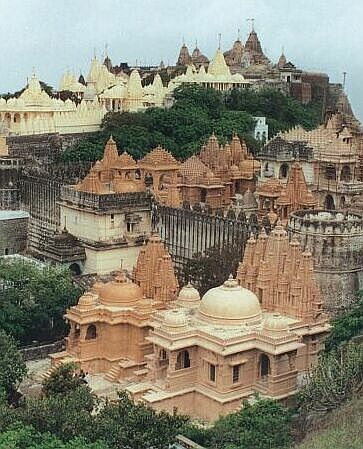
Palitana Jain temples

Kartika Purnima is an important religious day for Jains who celebrate it by visiting Palitana, a Jain pilgrimage centre. Thousands of Jain pilgrims flock to the foothills of Shatrunjay hills of Palitana taluka on the day of Kartika Purnima to undertake the auspicious yatra (journey). Also known as the Shri Shantrunjay Teerth Yatra, this walk is an important religious event in the life of a Jain devotee, who covers 216 km of rough mountainous terrain on foot to worship at the Adinath temple atop the hill. The day of Kartika Purnima is very significant in Jainism.Jains believe that Adinath, the first tirthankara, sanctified the hills by visiting it to deliver his first sermon. According to Jain texts, millions of sadhus and Sadhvis have attained salvation on these hills.

== Sikhism ==
Although, Kartika Purnima is nowadays celebrated as Gurupurab or Prakash Parva of Guru Nanak, the first Guru of the Sikhs, however this is controversial and historically invalid as per some Sikh scholars.

Sikh contemporary sources rather mention Vaisakh (Mid April) as birth month of Guru Nanak. It is said that the birth celebrations of Guru Nanak were changed to Kartik month during the time of Maharaja Ranjit Singh on the instance of Bhai Sant Singh. This was done to prevent Sikhs from joining Kartik Purnima fair at Hindu pilgrimage Ram Tirath Mandir in Amritsar.

== See also ==
- Dev Deepavali (Varanasi)
- List of Hindu festivals
