= Jalandhara =

Asura in Hinduism

- Affiliation: Asura
- Weapon: Trishula

Genealogy
- Parents: Shiva (creator); Varuna and Shukra (foster-fathers)
- Spouse: Vrinda

Jalandhara (Sanskrit: जलन्धर, lit. he who holds water), also known as Chalantarana (Sanskrit: चलन्तरण, lit. he who walks and swims) is an asura in Hinduism. He was born when Shiva opened his third eye in his fury when Indra struck him with his thunderbolt. However, Indra was saved, and the energy emitted from the eye was sent into the ocean. The energy developed into a boy and was raised by Varuna, and eventually, by Shukra. When he grew up, he conquered the three worlds - Svarga (heaven), Bhuloka (earth), and Patala (underworld). He married Vrinda, the daughter of Kalanemi. He was slain by his creator, Shiva.

== Legend ==
=== Birth ===
According to the Shiva Purana, when Indra and Brihaspati journeyed to Mount Kailasha to meet Shiva, their path was blocked by a naked yogi with matted hair and a radiant countenance. Unbeknownst to them, the yogi was Shiva himself, who had assumed this form to test their wisdom. Failing to recognise the deity, an infuriated Indra demanded that the man move out of their way. When the yogi remained motionless and silent, Indra's rage escalated, and he threatened him with his thunderbolt.

Upon this action, Indra's arm instantly became paralysed, and Shiva neutralised the thunderbolt. Furious at Indra's arrogance, Shiva's eyes turned crimson with rage, terrifying the king of the gods. This intense fury caused his third eye to open, unleashing a force that nearly incinerated Indra. Recognizing the supreme deity, Brihaspati immediately interceded, praying to Shiva and imploring him to pardon Indra. To spare Indra's life, Shiva redirected the destructive fire from his third eye toward the ocean. Upon striking the water, the celestial energy manifested into a crying boy. His piercing cries caused Brahma to descend from his abode. The ocean confessed to Brahma that he did not know the origin of the child. Brahma then prophesied that the boy would grow to become the emperor of the asuras, destined to be invulnerable to all except Shiva, and that upon his death, his energy would return to the deity's third eye.

=== Ascent to Power ===
Jalandhara's childhood was full of wonders. Borne up by the wind, he flew over the ocean; his pets were lions that he had caught; and the largest birds and fishes were subject to him.

=== Training & Early life ===
Jalandhara grew up to be a handsome man and was made the emperor of asuras by Shukra, their guru.

He married Vrinda, the daughter of the asura Kalanemi. Jalandhara ruled with justice and nobility. One day, the sage Bhargava (Shukra) came to meet Jalandhara. He narrated the tales of Hiranyakashipu and Virochana. He also told him how Vishnu had severed Rahu's head during the episode of the Samudra Manthana. The asura came to believe that the devas had treacherously taken his father Varuna's treasures. He sent one of his messengers, Ghasmara, to Indra to ask him to return his father's treasures. However, Indra refused to do so.

A fierce battle ensued between the devas and the asuras. Many warriors were killed on both sides. Shukra revived the asuras using his amṛtajīvinī vidya. Brihaspati revived the dead devas by using the medicinal herbs from the Drona mountain. Shukra counselled Jalandhara to uproot the mountain so that Brihaspati would be unable to employ the medicinal herbs to revive the devas. Jalandhara acquiesced and hurled the mountain Drona into the ocean. Demoralised, the devas requested Vishnu for his aid. A fierce battle was fought between Jalandhara and Vishnu, who rode upon Garuda and wielded his divine sword, Nandaka. Vishnu was impressed by Jalandhara's valiance in battle and granted him a boon of his choice. Jalandhara requested his brother-in-law Vishnu to stay in his eponymous city, bringing with him his followers and his wife, Lakshmi. Without his help, the devas were defeated by asuras, and Jalandhara became the lord of the three worlds (heaven, earth, and the underworld). He confiscated all the jewels that the devas and the gandharvas had hoarded during the Samudra Manthana and ruled virtuously, with nobody in his realm sick or lean.

=== War with Shiva ===
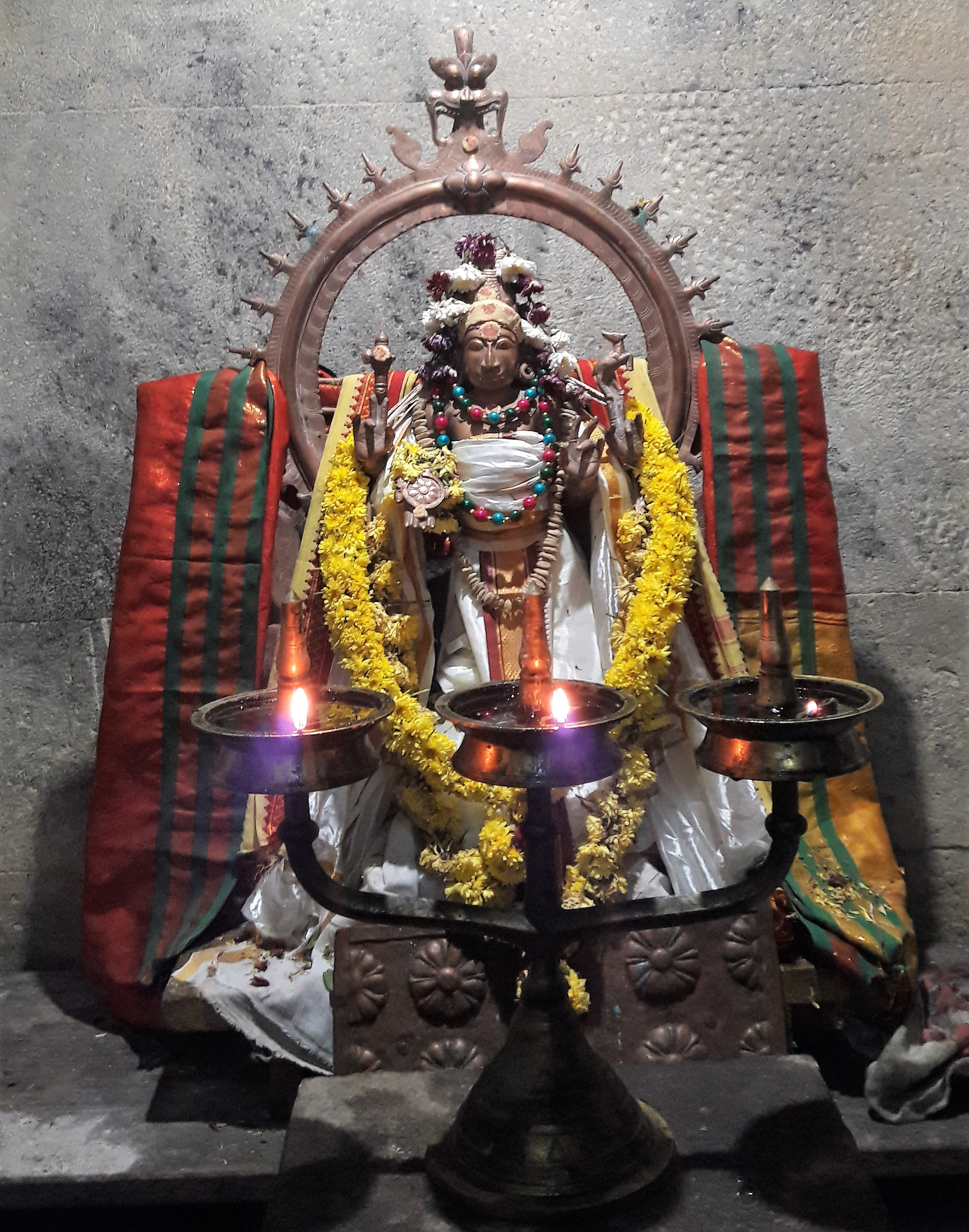
Shiva as Jalandharari (slayer of Jalandhara) with a chakra in his right hand

The devas were unhappy about their defeat, dejected at their being stripped of their authority. The divine sage, Narada, upon consulting with the devas, went to see Jalandhara. On being asked the purpose of his visit by Jalandhara, he described the beauty of Kailasha where Shiva lived, and that he wondered if any other place matched its beauty. In response, Jalandhara showed off his riches to Narada, who commented that he did not have the most beautiful woman as his wife. Narada then continued to describe Shiva's residence and also described to him about Parvati's beauty.

Jalandhara sent his messenger Rahu to Shiva and accused him of hypocrisy, pointing out that Shiva claimed to be an ascetic but kept a wife, Parvati. He proposed that Shiva hand over Parvati to him:

How can you live on alms and yet keep the beautiful Parvati? Give her to me, and wander from house to house with your alms bowl. You have fallen from your vow. You are a yogi, what need have you for the gem of wives? You live in the woods attended by goblins and ghosts; being a naked yogi, you should give your wife to one who will appreciate her better than you do.

Upon hearing these insults, Shiva became so angry that a fearsome creature (Kīrttimukha) sprang from his brow and nearly killed Rahu, the messenger who had delivered the demand. War being determined, Jalandhara marched first to Kailasha; but finding that Shiva had forsaken it and taken up a position on a mountain near Lake Manasa, he surrounded the mountain with his troops. Nandi marched against them, and spread destruction; however, the army of the gods suffered many losses. Parvati then urged Shiva to enter the war. Shiva carefully warned Parvati to be on her guard during his absence, as it was possible asuras in some disguise might visit her; after this, accompanied by Virabhadra and Manibhadra, two forms of his anger, Shiva went to the battlefield. Kartikeya came to fight with him, but was defeated. After his defeat, Ganesha tried to attack him, but was badly defeated by him and was left unconscious on the battlefield. Upon seeing Shiva and his avatars dominate the battlefield, Jalandhara created an illusion. This distracted his army, but not himself. Meanwhile, Jalandhara disguised himself as Shiva and went to Parvati in order to trick her. Parvati recognised him and fled, growing beyond infuriated. The goddess meditated on Vishnu, and when he appeared, she demanded that he deceive Vrinda, just like Jalandhara had tried to deceive her.

He himself has shown the path. Know that to be the way in the same manner. At my bidding, make the chastity of his wife violated. O Viṣṇu, that great Daitya cannot be killed otherwise. In the earth there is no other virtue equal to chastity.

— Shiva Purana, Chapter 52, Verses 50 - 51

Vishnu caused Vrinda to dream that Jalandhara had been killed by Shiva. Posing as an ascetic, he creates the illusion that Jalandhara is then restored to life by him. Delighted to see her husband restored to life, Vrinda sported with him for many days in the forest. She recognised that it was Vishnu in disguise, and curses him that someday someone would trick his own wife (which becomes true when Sita is kidnapped by Ravana) just like how he had tricked her, that he would roam about in distress with Shesha (Lakshmana), and that he would seek the help of monkeys (vanaras). Saying thus, she entered the fire to immolate herself. After her death, her soul left her form from the funeral pyre, joining Parvati.

=== Death ===
Jalandhara, hearing of this deception and his wife's death, was enraged and left Mount Kailasha, returning to the battlefield. The illusion ending, Shiva and his forces realised the truth. Shiva engaged Shumbha and Nishumbha in battle, but they soon fled. They were later killed by Parvati.

Jalandhara then engaged Shiva in battle. Towards the end of the battle, when most of Jalandhara's army had been slaughtered, Shiva beheaded him with a chakra (discus) created from his toe. Upon his death, his soul merged with Shiva, just like Vrinda's soul had merged with Parvati.

=== Television ===
Television serial	Played by
Om Namah Shivay	Nimai Bali as Jalandhara asura
Devon Ke Dev...Mahadev	Mohit Raina as Jalandhara asura
Mahakali – Anth Hi Aarambh Hai	Saurabh Raj Jain as Jalandhara asura
Hara Hara Mahadeva (Kannada remake of Devon Ke Dev...Mahadev)	Vinay Gowda as Jalandhara asura
Shiv Shakti: Tap Tyaag Taandav	Raam Yashvardhan as Jalandhara asura
Vighnaharta Ganesha	Malkhan Singh as Jalandhara asura
