= Prabodhini Ekadashi =

Hindu observance

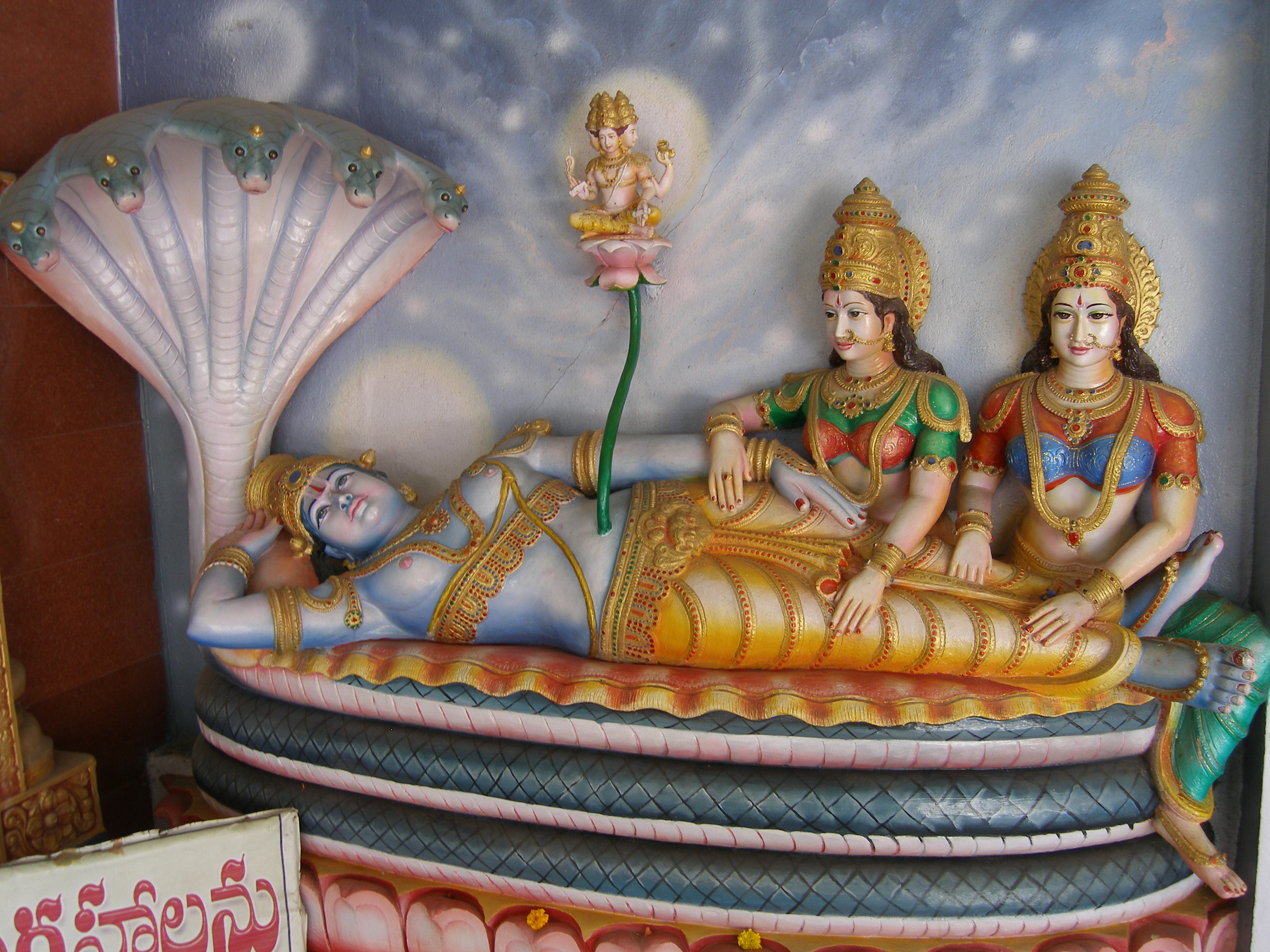
- Statue of Narayana lying on Shesha beside Sridevi and Bhudevi, aspects of Lakshmi
- Also called: Deva Uttana Ekadashi, Deothan, Kartika Shukla Ekadashi
- Observed by: Hindus, especially Vaishnavas
- Type: Hindu
- Significance: Marks the end of the Chaturmas period.
- Observances: Prayers and religious rituals, including puja to Vishnu
- Date: Decided by the Lunar calendar
- 2025 date: 1 November
- Frequency: Annual
- Related to: Shayani Ekadashi

Prabodhini Ekadashi (Sanskrit: प्रबोधिनी एकादशी, romanized: Prabodhinī Ekādaśī), also known as Deva Uttana Ekadashi (Sanskrit: देव उत्तान एकादशी, romanized: Deva Uttāna Ekādaśī), is the 11th lunar day (ekadashi) in the bright fortnight (Shukla Paksha) of the Hindu month of Kartika. It marks the end of the four-month period of Chaturmasya, when the god Vishnu is believed to be asleep. It is believed that Vishnu sleeps on the day of Shayani Ekadashi, and wakes on this day.

The end of Chaturmasya, when marriages are prohibited, signifies the beginning of the Hindu wedding season. Prabodhini Ekadashi is followed by Kartika Purnima, which day is celebrated as Deva Deepavali, the Deepavali of the devas.

The symbolic union of Vishnu and Lakshmi or Tulasi Vivaha is also celebrated on this day.

== Nomenclature ==
The occasion is known by various names such as Prabodhini Ekadashi (awakening eleventh), Vishnu Prabodhini (awakening of Vishnu), Hari Prabodhini, Deva Prabodhini Ekadashi, Uttana Ekadashi, and Deothan.

This day is known as Thulo Ekadashi ("Biggest of the Ekadashis") in Nepal.

== Celebrations ==
A fast is observed on Prabodhini Ekadashi and Tulsi Vivaha is celebrated. During Tulsi Vivaha, a black, fossilised stone or shaligram (representing the form of Vishnu) is placed next to a tulsi plant (representing the form of Lakshmi), a symbolic act of uniting both deities in marriage. During the evening, devotees prepare floor designs by geru paste (red soil) and rice paste in some traditions. Images of Lakshmi and Vishnu are also prepared from it. Lakshmi puja and Vishnu puja are observed during the evening time, with the offerings of sugarcane, rice, dried red chillies, which are subsequently given to pandits.

=== Pandharpur Kartiki Fair ===
In Maharashtra, Prabodhini Ekadashi is linked with the god Vithoba - a form of Vishnu. Varkari pilgrims throng the Pandharpur temple of Vithoba on this day. The celebrations in Pandharpur continue for five days, till the full moon day (Kartika Purnima). On Prabodhini Ekadashi, the chief minister or a minister of Maharashtra state performs ritual components of worship on behalf of the Government of Maharashtra. This form of worship is known as sarkari-mahapuja.

=== Mt. Girnar ===
In Gujarat, more 800,000 pilgrims perform the 32-km Lili Parikrama, circumambulation of Mt. Girnar, over a two-day period. This performed as a gesture of thanksgiving to the gods, who are believed to have assembled on the mountain.

=== Pushkar Fair ===
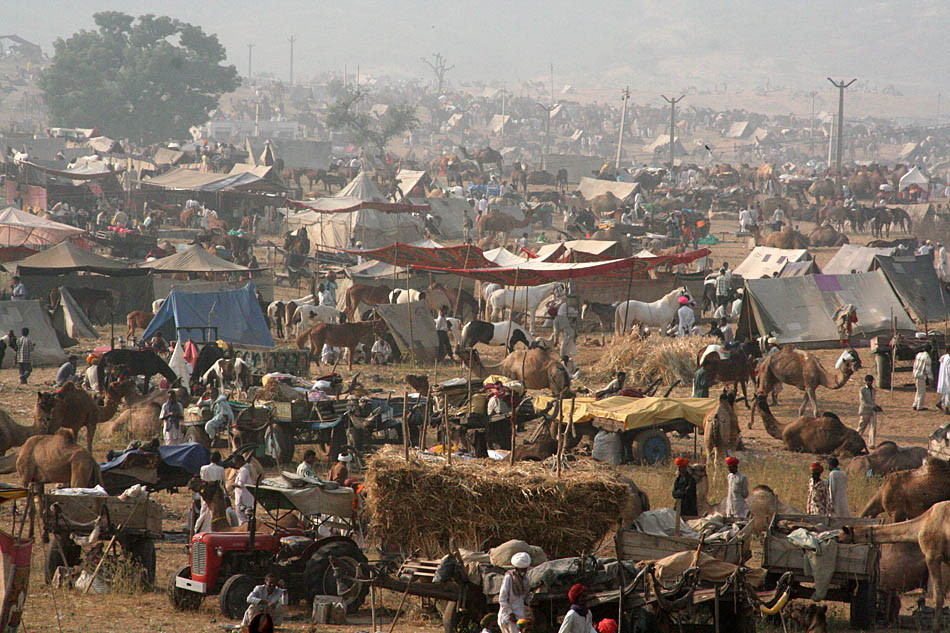
Puskar Mela, 2006

In Pushkar, Rajasthan, the Pushkar Fair or Pushkar mela commences on this day and continues till the full moon day (Kartika Purnima). This fair is held in the honour of god Brahma, whose temple stands at Pushkar. A ritual bath during the five days of the fair in the Pushkar lake is considered to lead one to salvation. Sadhus gather here and stay from ekadashi to full moon day in caves. About 200,000 people and 25,000 camels assemble in Pushkar, one of Asia's largest camel fairs.

== Rituals ==
=== Sugarcane harvest ===
Prabodhini Ekadashi also marks the beginning of sugarcane harvest. The farmer performs a puja in the field and ceremoniously cuts some sugarcane, laying some at the boundary of the field and distributing five canes to a Brahmin priest, blacksmith, carpenter, washer-man and water-carrier and taking five canes at home. At home, figures of Vishnu and his consort Lakshmi are drawn on a wooden-board with cowdung and butter. The sugarcane are tied together at the top and placed round the board. Some cotton, betel-nut, lentils and sweets are offered along with a yagna (fire sacrifice). A prabhatiya, or song urging the god to wake, is sung. The canes are then broken and hung off the roof till Holi, when they are burnt.

=== Swaminarayan sect ===
Prabodhini Ekadashi is considered as an important Ekadashi in the Swaminarayan sect. The day commemorates the diksha, or religious initiation, of Swaminarayan by his guru Ramanand Swami on October 28, 1800. The day also commemorates the passing of authority by Ramanand Swami to Swaminarayan on November 16, 1801. Swaminarayan followers observe a waterless fast and offer an offering of fresh vegetables to the deities.
