= Chaturmasya =

Hindu observance

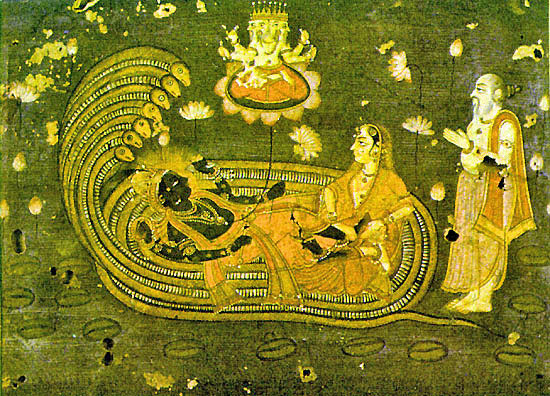
- Vishnu sleeps on his serpent, Shesha.
- Significance: Marks the four-month period of Vishnu's yoganidra (spiritual sleep)
- Begins: Shayani Ekadashi
- Ends: Prabodhini Ekadashi
- Duration: 4 months
- Frequency: Annual

Chaturmasya (Sanskrit: चातुर्मास्य, lit. 'Cāturmāsya'; Pali: Catumāsa), also rendered Chāturmāsa, is a holy period of four months, observed across major Indian religions during the annual monsoon season. The name comes directly from the Sanskrit words chatur, which means "four", and māsa, which means "month". It is a dedicated time for both monastics and lay householders to practice special vows, fasting, and spiritual discipline. The practice originally began with early wandering monks who stopped traveling during the heavy rains to avoid accidentally harming the rapid increase of plant and insect life. During the medieval period, this seasonal retreat became closely linked with wealthy trade guilds and town bankers who funded the housing and care of the stationary monks.

In Hinduism, the period tracks the four months from Shayani Ekadashi, when the deity Vishnu enters a spiritual sleep, until he wakes up on Prabodhini Ekadashi. Hindu householders observe these months by giving up favorite foods or keeping special fasting vows, while also celebrating major festivals like Guru Purnima, Ganesha Chaturthi, and Navaratri. In Jainism, this mandatory stay is called Varshayog and is strictly required for all monks and nuns to follow their primary vow of nonviolence. The Jain retreat features the reading of the Kalpa Sutra scripture during the festival of Paryushana and concludes with a formal ceremony for mutual forgiveness. Similarly, the Buddhist version of this retreat is called Vassa, which requires a fixed three-month stay that ends with the Kathina festival where the community donates new robes to the monks.

== Etymology ==
Chaturmasya literally means "four months", derived from the Sanskrit chatur (चतुर्), "four", and māsa (मासः), "month".

== History ==
The practice of staying in one place during the rainy season began with early Indian religious movements, known as the Śramaṇa traditions. Before formal rules were written down, wandering monks stopped traveling during the monsoon because heavy rains made travel difficult and increased the risk of harming living creatures. Early texts indicate that followers of Pārśvanātha, the 23rd tirthankara, observed these seasonal stops during the eighth and seventh centuries BCE. This custom developed due to the climate of the Ganges Basin, where the monsoon season caused a rapid increase in plant and insect life. Traveling during this time made it difficult for monks to follow their primary vow of nonviolence.

In the sixth century BCE, Mahavira formalized these traditional seasonal stops into a regular, mandatory rule for monks, called Varshayog. Traditional accounts state that Mahavira regularized the schedule of the retreat to manage the conduct and safety of his followers. Records indicate that Mahavira spent his 42nd and final rainy season retreat in Pawapuri. The end of this final retreat coincided with his death and liberation, an event celebrated during Diwali. The conclusion of his final retreat was observed by the rulers of the local Malla and Licchavi regions.

The rules for the monsoon retreat were codified in the fourth century BCE by Acharya Bhadrabahu in the Kalpa Sūtra. This text is part of the Cheda Sutra class, which deals with monastic discipline and corrections for misconduct. The specific section for the rainy season, called the Samachari, contains daily rules for monks regarding how far they can travel, their fasting schedules, and how they should interact with laypeople. These rules were passed down orally by generations of monks before being permanently recorded. The text also outlines specific emergencies, such as floods or famines, when a monk is allowed to temporarily leave their seasonal residence.

The spoken rules were collected and written down permanently during the Council of Valabhi in the mid-fifth century CE. Led by a senior monk named Devardhigani Kshamashraman, the council recorded the traditions of the rainy season retreat on palm leaves. This meeting permanently fixed the timeline of Varshayog within the Śvetāmbara scriptures. In later centuries, these written rules became a frequent subject for illustrated manuscripts. From the fifteenth century onward, wealthy families frequently commissioned decorated copies of the Kalpa Sūtra, which were read out loud to the public during the annual retreat.

During the medieval period, the practice of Chaturmasya became closely linked with the business activities of community leaders in Western and Central India. Trade guilds, called Mahajans, and city bankers, known as Nagarsheths, took responsibility for organizing and paying for the housing of monks during the monsoon. These business leaders regularly invited specific groups of monks to spend the season in their cities. Because the monks stayed in one town for four months, they often helped settle local commercial disputes. This seasonal relationship led to increased donations from merchants to fund local public projects and temple construction.

== Duration and Timing ==
The timing and total length of the rainy season retreat depend directly on when the monsoon rains arrive in India. While the name of the period literally means four months, different religious traditions change the exact start dates and lengths of stay to match their own rules.

In Jainism, this seasonal stay is called Varshayog and is a strict rule for all monks and nuns. Normally, Jain ascetics must keep moving and cannot stay in one town for long. Their standard rules limit stays to a maximum of 29 nights for male monks and 59 nights for female nuns so they do not form local attachments. This traveling lifestyle stops completely for four months during the rainy season. Monks stay in one place to avoid accidentally stepping on or killing the huge number of insects and small bugs that appear in the wet weather. These specific daily rules and fasting schedules for the rainy season were written down in the 4th century BCE by Acharya Bhadrabahu in the Kalpa Sutra. The Jain retreat starts during the lunar month of Ashadha (June–July) and ends in the autumn month of Kartika (October–November), allowing the monks to start traveling again.

In Hinduism, the standard calendar tracks the four months from the eleventh bright lunar day of Ashadha (Shayani Ekadashi) until it finishes on Prabodhini Ekadashi. However, Hindu sanyasis (wandering ascetics) follow a shorter calendar that limits their stay to exactly four fortnights instead of four full months. This shorter ascetic stay begins on the full moon of Ashadha (Guru Purnima) and ends on the full moon of Bhadrapada. Similarly, the Buddhist version of this retreat is called Vassa, which requires a fixed three-month stay for monks. This Buddhist retreat starts right after the full moon of Ashadha and ends with a month-long festival called Kathina, where laypeople give new robes to the monks.

== Observances and Festivals ==
During Chaturmas, the most important period for Jains is a mid-season festival focused on fasting and spiritual reflection. Śvetāmbara Jains observe this retreat for eight days as Paryushana, during which monks read the Kalpa Sutra scripture aloud to the public. Digambara Jains observe a ten-day period called Das Lakshana Parva immediately afterward, which focuses on ten specific spiritual virtues. Both traditions conclude these holy days with a major ceremony centered on asking for mutual forgiveness from all living creatures. Throughout the entire four months, lay householders also follow strict dietary rules, such as avoiding root vegetables and green vegetables, to prevent harming small life forms.

In Hinduism, the Chaturmas period is filled with several major religious festivals and special fasting vows known as vratas. The season traditionally opens with Guru Purnima, a day dedicated to honoring spiritual teachers and mentors. During these months, devotees celebrate the birthdays of important deities, including Krishna Janmashtami and Ganesha Chaturthi. The period also includes the multi-day festival of Navratri before the entire seasonal observance concludes around Diwali. Many Hindu householders choose to give up their favorite foods or limit themselves to one meal a day during this time to gain spiritual merit.

For Buddhists, the rainy season retreat features internal monastic rituals alongside community celebrations. At the end of the three-month Vassa retreat, monks perform the Pavarana ritual to ask one another for forgiveness for any mistakes made during their stay. This leads directly into the Kathina festival, where laypeople gather at monasteries to give new robes and essential supplies to the monks. This act of giving strengthens the economic and spiritual bond between the local community and the stationary monastics.

== Hinduism ==
=== Literature ===
Chaturmasya begins on the eleventh day of the Hindu lunar month of Ashadha or Devashayani Ekadashi. This is celebrated as the day that the deity Vishnu enters a yogic sleep (yoga nidra) on his serpent, Shesha, for a period of four months and wakes up on Prabodhini Ekadashi. This is associated with the story of King Bali and Vishnu's incarnation as Vamana. Bali, the king of demons, had seized power from the Indra (the king of the gods) and was ruling over the entire universe. The gods sought shelter from Vishnu to regain their power. Vishnu incarnated as Vamana, a dwarf, and asked Bali for three steps of land. As soon as Bali obliged, Vamana assumed a gigantic form. With his first step, he covered the entire earth, and with his second step he covered the mid-world. Since there was no place for his third step, Bali suggested that Vamana place it on his head. Vamana was pleased with him and granted him a boon, and with his third step, sent Bali to Patala (netherworld). According to the boon, Bali requested Vamana or Vishnu to live with him in Patala. Vishnu obliged which worried all of the deities, including the goddess Lakshmi (Vishnu's consort). Lakshmi then devised a plan which only allowed Vishnu to live with Bali for a certain duration. This duration is also known as Chaturmasya or the period that Vishnu "sleeps" while visiting King Bali.

Followers of the Shaivism sect recall the story of the churning of the ocean of milk. The story is recalls how Shiva saved creation by drinking poison called "halahala" which emerged from the ocean while it was being churned by the asuras (demons) and devas (demigods). The poison was held at his throat to prevent it from spreading to the rest of the body, thus turning it blue.

=== Observances ===
Performing lifecycle rites such as weddings is considered inauspicious during chaturmasya. Instead it is seen as a suitable time for householders to have an annual renewal of faith by listening to discourses on dharma, and by meditation and vrata (self-control). Penance, austerities, religious observances, recital of mantras, bathing in holy rivers, performing sacrifices, and charity are prescribed. Fasts and purity during this period help maintain health, for which there is likely a scientific rationale, disease spreading more readily with the onset of monsoon. A number of Hindus, particularly those following the Vaishnava tradition, refrain from eating meals that are oily, salty, sweet or that contain onion or garlic, and eggplant during this period.

A Sansyasi performing Vyasa puja as a part of Chaturmasya rituals

The sanyasis or ascetics observe Chaturmasya for four fortnights, beginning on full moon day of the month of Ashadha, also known as Guru Purnima or Vyas Purnima, and ending on full moon day of the month of Bhadrapada. Sanyasis are supposed to halt at one place during this period.

=== Celebrations ===
Major celebrations within this period include:

- Guru Purnima
- Krishna Janmashtami
- Onam
- Raksha Bandhan
- Ganesh Chaturthi
- Navaratri (Dasahra – Durga Puja – Vijayadashami)
- Diwali
- Champa Shashthi (Margashirsha bright 6th ) - Per custom in Maharashtra, Chaturmasya ends on this day.

== Jainism ==
In Jainism this practice is collectively known as Varshayog and is prescribed for Jain monasticism. Wandering monks such as mendicants and ascetics in Jainism, believe that during the rainy season, countless bugs, insects and tiny creatures that cannot be seen in the naked eye take birth massively. Therefore, these monks reduce the amount of harm they do to other creatures so they opt to stay in a single place for the four months to incur minimal harm to other lives. These monks, who generally do not stay in one place for long(59 nights for females, 29 nights for males), observe their annual 'Rains Retreat' during this period, by living in one place during the entire period amidst lay people, observing a vow of silence (mauna), meditation, fasting and other austerities, and also giving religious discourses to the local public.

During the four-month rainy-season period, when the mendicants must stay in one place, the chief sadhu of every group gives a daily sermon (pravacana, vyakhyana), attended mostly by women and older, retired men, but on special days by most of the lay congregation. During their eight months of travel, the sadhus give sermons whenever requested, most often when they come to a new village or town in their travels.

One of the most important Jain festivals, Paryushana, falls during the beginning of this period, which concludes with Forgiveness Day, Kshamavani Diwas, wherein lay people and disciples say Micchami Dukkadam and ask forgiveness from each other. Amongst Jain merchants, there is a tradition of inviting monks to their respective cities during Chaturmasya to give religious instruction.

In Jainism, the third part of the classical Jain text Kalpa Sutra, written by Bhadrabahu I in the 4th century BCE, deals with rules for ascetics and laws during the four months (chaturmas) of the rainy season, when ascetics temporarily abandon their wandering life and settle down amidst the laity. This is the time when the festival of Paryushan is celebrated and the Kalpasutra is traditionally recited.

== Buddhism ==
Gautama Buddha stayed at the royal garden of King Bimbisara of Rajgir, whom he had recently converted, for the period of Chaturmasya and gave sermons: this practice is followed by monks to this day. Another reason for ascetics to stay in one place during the rainy season is that the tropical climate produces a large number of insects, which would be trampled by travelling monks.

Vassa is varsha-vas i.e. three-month annual stay observed by Theravada monks. It begins with Asalha Puja. At the end of Bassa, during Kathina, new robes are donated by the laity to the monks. Kathina is a Buddhist festival which comes at the end of Vassa, the three-month rainy season retreat for Theravada Buddhists in Bangladesh (known as Kaṭhina Cībar Dān), Myanmar, Thailand, India, Sri Lanka, Vietnam, Cambodia, Laos, Malaysia, and Singapore. The season during which a monastery may hold Kathina is one month long, beginning after the full moon of the eleventh month in the Lunar calendar (usually October).
