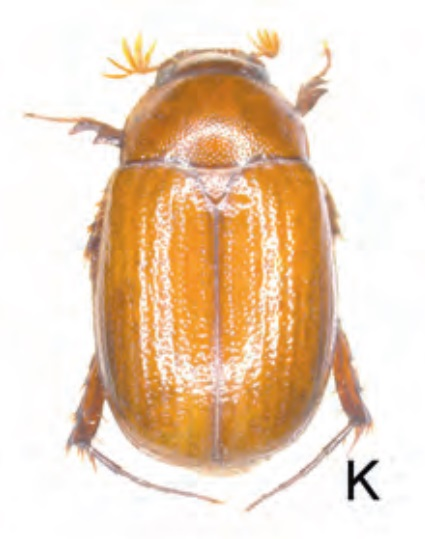

Scientific classification
- Kingdom: Animalia
- Phylum: Arthropoda
- Class: Insecta
- Order: Coleoptera
- Suborder: Polyphaga
- Infraorder: Scarabaeiformia
- Family: Scarabaeidae
- Genus: Neoserica
- Species: N. pushkarensis

Binomial name
- Neoserica pushkarensis Ahrens & Fabrizi, 2016

= Neoserica pushkarensis =

Species of beetle

Neoserica pushkarensis is a species of beetle of the family Scarabaeidae. It is found in India (Rajastan).

== Description ==
Adults reach a length of about 5.6–6.2 mm. They have a reddish brown, oval body. The antennae are yellowish brown and the dorsal surface is nearly glabrous and shiny, except for some single setae on the head.

== Etymology ==
The species is named for its type locality, Pushkar.
