= Nag Pahad =

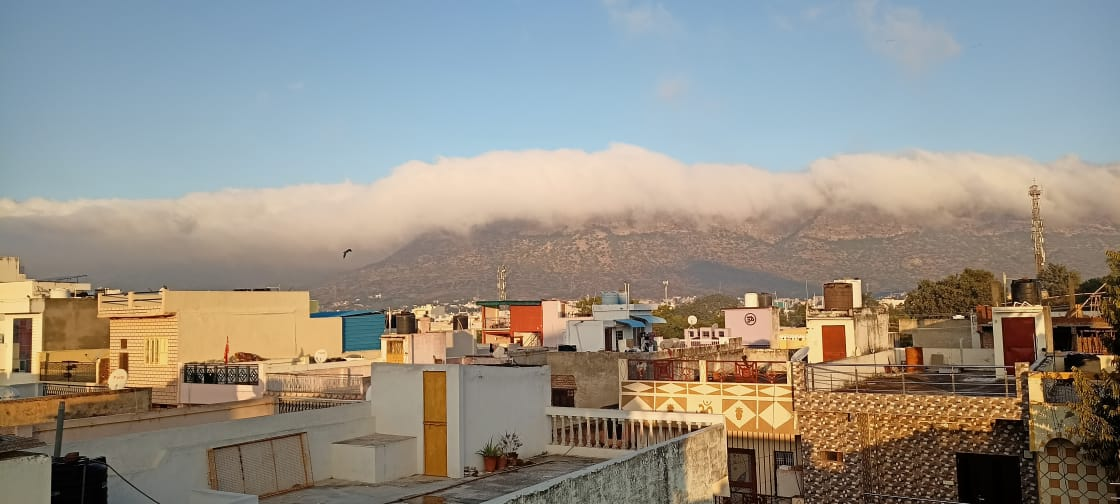
- View of Nag Pahad from Pushkar

Highest point
- Coordinates: 26.496260°N 74.597432°E

Geography
- Location: Between Pushkar and Ajmer, Rajasthan, India
- Parent range: Aravalli mountain range

Nag Pahad (also known as Naga Pahar; English: Snake Mountain) is a mountain in the Aravalli mountain range located between the towns of Pushkar and Ajmer in the Indian state of Rajasthan. This mountain holds cultural and mythological importance, intertwined with legends and beliefs that have been passed down through generations.

== Location and significance ==
Situated in the Aravalli range, Nag Pahad serves as a natural divider between the town of Ajmer and the holy city of Pushkar. The mountain range is not only a geological formation but also a place of spiritual significance, and is written about in Hindu texts.

According to local beliefs, Nag Pahad is said to be the abode of the revered sage Agastya Rishi. The mountain is also associated with the ancient story of Vatu, the son of Lord Brahma. Vatu took refuge on Nag Pahad after being disciplined by Chyavan Rishi for his mischievous antics. The mountain is also the site of the legendary Naag Kund, a sacred water source believed to have existed atop its slopes.

Nag Pahad has become a place of pilgrimage and spiritual exploration for devotees and tourists.

On the slopes of Nag Pahad is the Nag Pahad Wale Balaji Temple, a prominent Hindu temple dedicated to Lord Balaji. This temple serves as a place of worship, with panoramic views of the surrounding landscape.
