= SkyWaltz =

Company

SkyWaltz is a hot air balloon safari company at Jaipur and New Delhi, India. They received official authorization from the Ministry of Civil Aviation to conduct hot air balloon activities in India in January, 2008.

== History ==
The company started its operation in 2008 after receiving authorization from the Ministry of Central Aviation. It is a separate business venture of E-Factor Adventure Tourism (P) Ltd. which is headquartered in Noida, UP. The company was first operational in Rajasthan and the Delhi NCR, but it has extended its operations by launching its Balloon Safari experience in Maharashtra. With permissions in place for pan-India operations, it has chartered around 23,000 passengers as of September 2019. The firm has participated in the Pushkar International Balloon Festival.

Along with their headquarters in the Delhi NCR, the company also has branches in Jaipur, Udaipur (Rajasthan) and Lonavala (Maharashtra).

The company, in association with Uttar Pradesh Government, organized the Taj Balloon Festival 2015 at Agra, which was inaugurated on 13 November. Balloonists from 12 countries, including the United States, United Kingdom, the United Arab Emirates, and Spain, participated in the event.

== Awards and recognition ==
The company was the first Government-recognized and fully licensed company to operate hot air balloons in India. It was also the winner of the "Most Innovative Tourism Experience", awarded by the Ministry of Tourism, Government of India in 2008-2009.
