= Pushkar Lake =

Lake in India

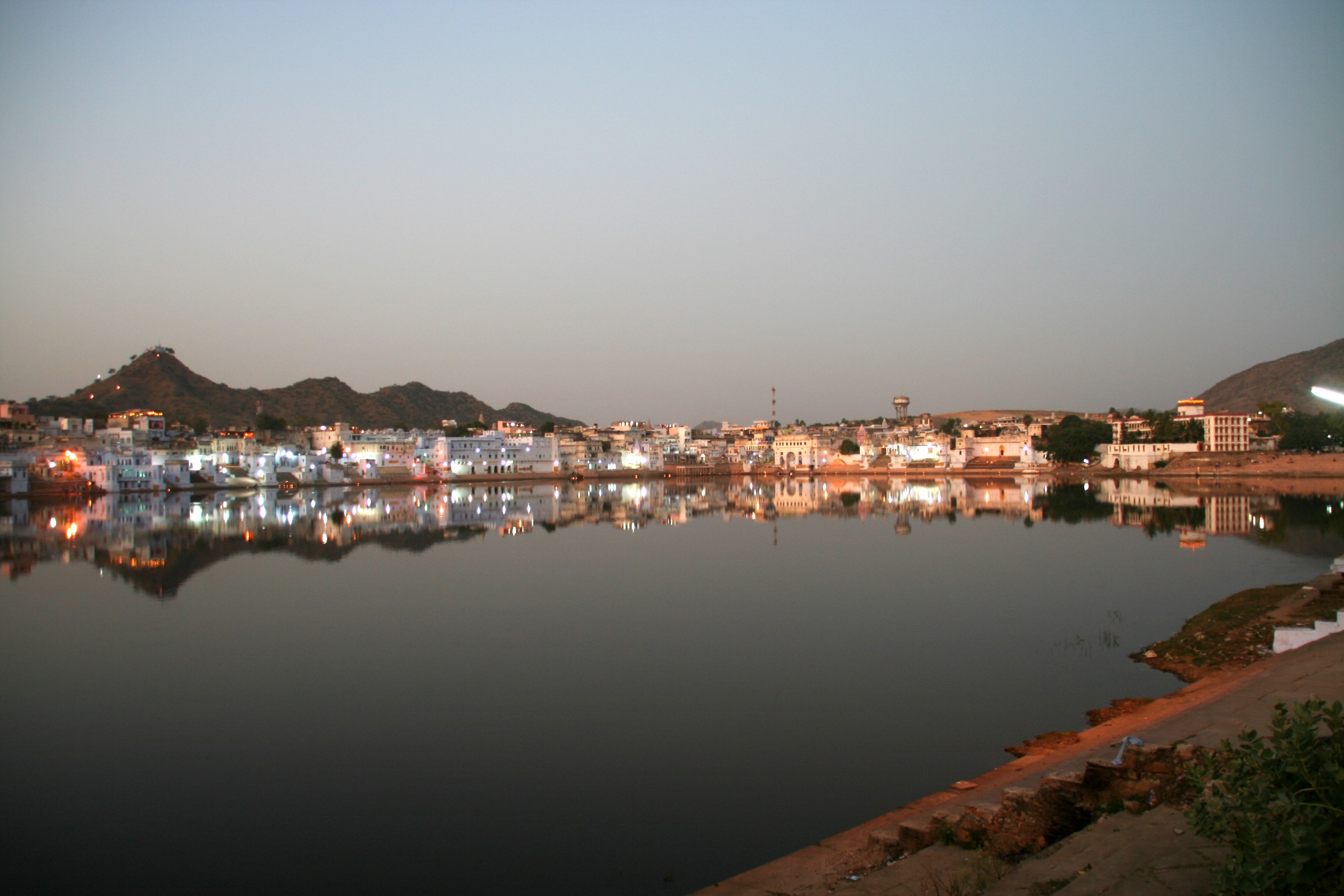

- Location within Rajasthan
- Interactive Map
- Location: Pushkar, Rajasthan
- Coordinates: 26°29′14″N 74°33′15″E
- Lake type: [Artificial Lake]
- Primary inflows: Luni River
- Primary outflows: Luni River
- Catchment area: 22 km^{2} (8.5 sq mi)
- Basin countries: India
- Surface area: 22 km^{2} (8.5 sq mi)
- Average depth: 8 m (26 ft)
- Max. depth: 10 m (33 ft)
- Water volume: 790,000 cubic metres (28,000,000 cu ft)
- Surface elevation: 530 m (1,740 ft)
- Settlements: Pushkar

Pushkar Lake or Pushkar Sarovar is located in the town of Pushkar near Ajmer city in Ajmer district of the Rajasthan state of western India. Pushkar Lake is a sacred lake for the Hindus. The Hindu scriptures describe it as "Tirtha-Guru" [Thirtha Raj]– the perceptor of pilgrimage sites related to a water-body and relate it to the mythology of Brahma, the creator-god in Hinduism, whose most prominent temple stands in Pushkar. The Pushkar Lake finds mention on coins as early as the 4th century BC.

Pushkar Lake is surrounded by 52 bathing ghats (a series of steps leading to the lake), where pilgrims throng in large numbers to take a sacred bath, especially around Kartik Poornima (October–November) when the Pushkar Fair is held. A dip in the sacred lake is believed to cleanse sins and cure skin diseases. Over 500 Hindu temples are situated around the lake precincts.

Tourism, deforestation and pollution in the surroundings have taken a heavy toll on the lake, adversely affecting its water quality, reducing the water levels and destroying the fish population. As part of conservation measures, the government is undertaking de-silting, de-weeding, water treatment, and afforestation as well as mass awareness programme.

== Geography ==
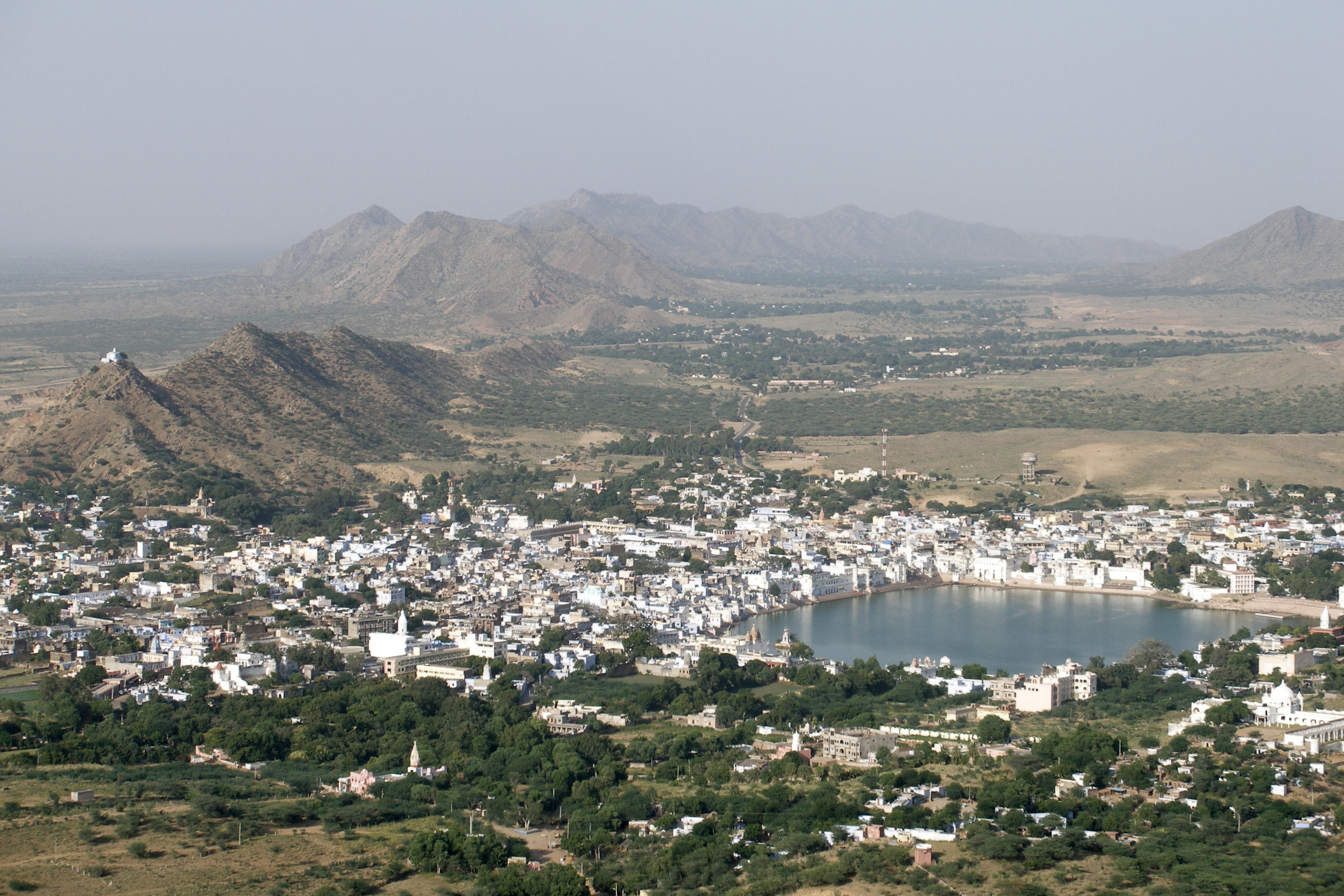
Pushkar city and lake, viewed from hill above

Pushkar Lake around which the Pushkar town has developed is in the Ajmer district in the state of Rajasthan, India amidst the Aravalli Range of hills. The mountain range known as Nag Parbat ("snake mountain") separates the lake from the city of Ajmer. The valley is formed between the two parallel ranges of the Aravalli hills (in elevation range of 650–856 metres (2,133–2,808 ft) running south-west to north-east. Situated at 14 kilometres (8.7 mi) northwest from Ajmer, the artificial Pushkar Lake created by building a dam is surrounded by deserts and hills on all three sides. The lake is categorized as a "Sacred Lake" under the list of "Classification of Lakes in India".

The soil and topography in the catchment are predominantly sandy with very low water retention capacity. The land use pattern in the Pushkar valley that drains into the lake comprises 30% of the area under shifting sand dunes, 30% under hills (degraded and barren) and streams and 40% of the area is agricultural.

=== Climate ===
The region experiences semi-arid climatic conditions with dry and hot summers and cool winters. The summer months of May and June are the hottest, with a maximum temperature of around 45 °C (113 °F). During the winter months, the maximum mean temperature is in the range of 25–10 °C (77–50 °F). Rain mainly occurs during a short spell of two months during July and August. The recorded average rainfall is in the range of 400–600 millimetres (16–24 in). Rainfall is also recorded some times during winter months of January and February.

From April to September, strong winds blowing in the southwest to northeast direction add to the formation of sand dunes.

=== Hydrology ===
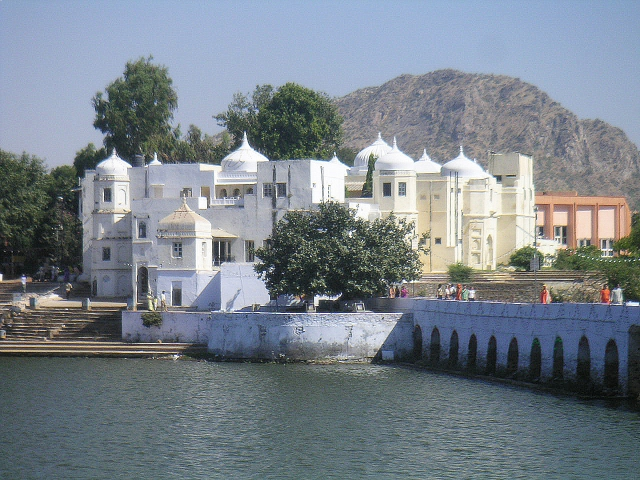
Foot bridge of arches to cross the inlet channel to the lake during parikrama of ghats and temples on ghats

The Pushkar Lake drains a catchment of the Aravalli hills covering an area of 22 square kilometres (8.5 mi^{2}). The lake has a water surface area of 22 hectares (54 acres). It is a perennial lake sourced by the monsoon rainfall over the catchment. The depth of water in the lake varies from season to season from 8–10 metres (26–33 ft). The total storage capacity of the lake is 0.79 million cubic metres (1.03 million cu yd). As the lake periphery is encircled by 52 ghats of various sizes, the surface water flow from the catchment into the lake is channeled through a series of arches under a footbridge, 110 metres (360 ft) long at the southern end. The footbridge facilitates the parikrama (circumambulation) that is performed by pilgrims around the lake covering all the 52 ghats (covers an area of 2 hectares (4.9 acres)).

== Flora and fauna ==
Pushkar Lake, when full, is rich in fish and other aquatic life. The depth of the lake has substantially shrunk – to less than 1.5 metres (4.9 ft) from a maximum of 9 metres (30 ft) – resulting in the death of large fish weighing 5–20 kilograms (11–44 lb), caused due to the viscous water and the lack of oxygen for the fish to survive. Since the region where the lake and its valley is situated is arid, the flora and fauna recorded relate to desert plants, including cactus and thorny bushes, as well as desert animals like camels and cattle. Man-eating crocodiles used to be a menace in the Puskhar Lake, resulting in the deaths of people. Pilgrims were aware of this fact, yet many considered it lucky to be eaten by crocodiles. The crocodiles were caught with nets by the British and shifted to a nearby reservoir.

== History ==
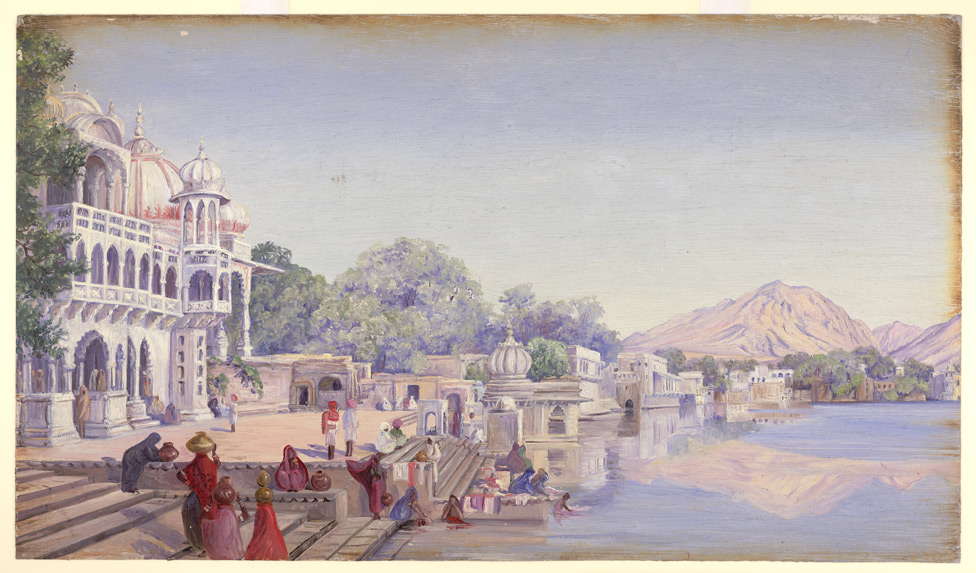
An artist's view of Pushkar Lake in late 18th century during British rule

Pushkar Lake's history dates back to the 4th century BC. Numismatics, in the form of punched Greek and Kushan coins date the lake back to this time. Inscriptions found at Sanchi attest to the lake's existence to the 2nd century BC. This suggests Pushkar Lake was already pilgrimage site, even if it did not lie on the trade route.

In the fifth century AD, Jin Chinese Buddhist monk and traveller Fa Xian made reference to the number of visitors to Pushkar Lake.

A story tells of a 9th-century Gurjara king, Nahar Rao Pratihar of Mandore, chasing a white boar to the lakeshore on a hunting expedition. In order to quench his thirst, he dipped his hand into the lake and was astonished to see the Leukoderma marks on his hand had disappeared. Impressed with the sacred curative nature of the lake, he got the lake restored to its glory. After discovering the curative properties of the lake, people have since visited to immerse in its waters and hope to be healed of skin problems.

The creation of Pushkar Lake, as an artificial lake, is also credited to the 12th century when a dam was built across the headwaters of the Luni River. The 10th Sikh guru, Guru Govind Singh (1666–1708), is said to have recited the Sikh sacred text Guru Granth Sahib on the banks of the lake.

During the Mughal rule, there was a short break in the lake's importance due to the levy of a pilgrim tax and a ban on religious processions. In 1615–16, the Mughal Emperor Jahangir (1569–1627) built his hunting lodge (now in total ruins) on the shores of Pushkar Lake to celebrate his victory over the local Rajput Rana (king). He came to the lodge 16 times for hunting during his stay in Ajmer, about 23 kilometres (14 mi) from Pushkar. This act violated the local taboo on killing any animals in the precincts of the sacred lake. He also committed sacrilege by breaking an image of Varaha, the boar Avatar of the god Vishnu, as it resembled a pig and thus was seen ans offensive to Islamic sensibilities. Jahangir's grandson, Emperor Aurangzeb (1618–1707), later destroyed and desecrated several temples, which were later rebuilt. However, during the rule of Jahangir's father, Emperor Akbar (1542–1605), there was a revival of not only the lake but also the Ajmer's Dargah dedicated to Sufi saint Moinuddin Chishti, of whom Akbar was a devotee.

The Rajput rulers of Amber, Bundi, Bikaner and Jaisalmer made great efforts to restore the importance of the lake and its surrounding temples. Credits given for modern additions to the building of ghats and the renovation/construction of temples go to Maharaja Man Singh I of Amber for the Raj Ghat and Man temple; Maha Rana Pratap for the Varaha temple; Daulat Rao Scindia for Kot Tirth Ghat, the Marathas-Anaji Scindia to the Koteshwar Mahadev temple and Govind Rao, the Maratha governor of Ajmer for Shiva Ghat; to the British Raj for combining the religious pilgrimage with a cattle fair to generate revenues to improving the lake and its surroundings; and gifting of the Jaipur Ghat and the Main Palace on the ghat in 1956 by the Maharaja of Jaipur.

== Religious significance ==
There are various legends from Hindu epics Ramayana and Mahabharata and the Puranic scriptures which mention the Pushkar Lake and the town of Pushkar surrounding it.

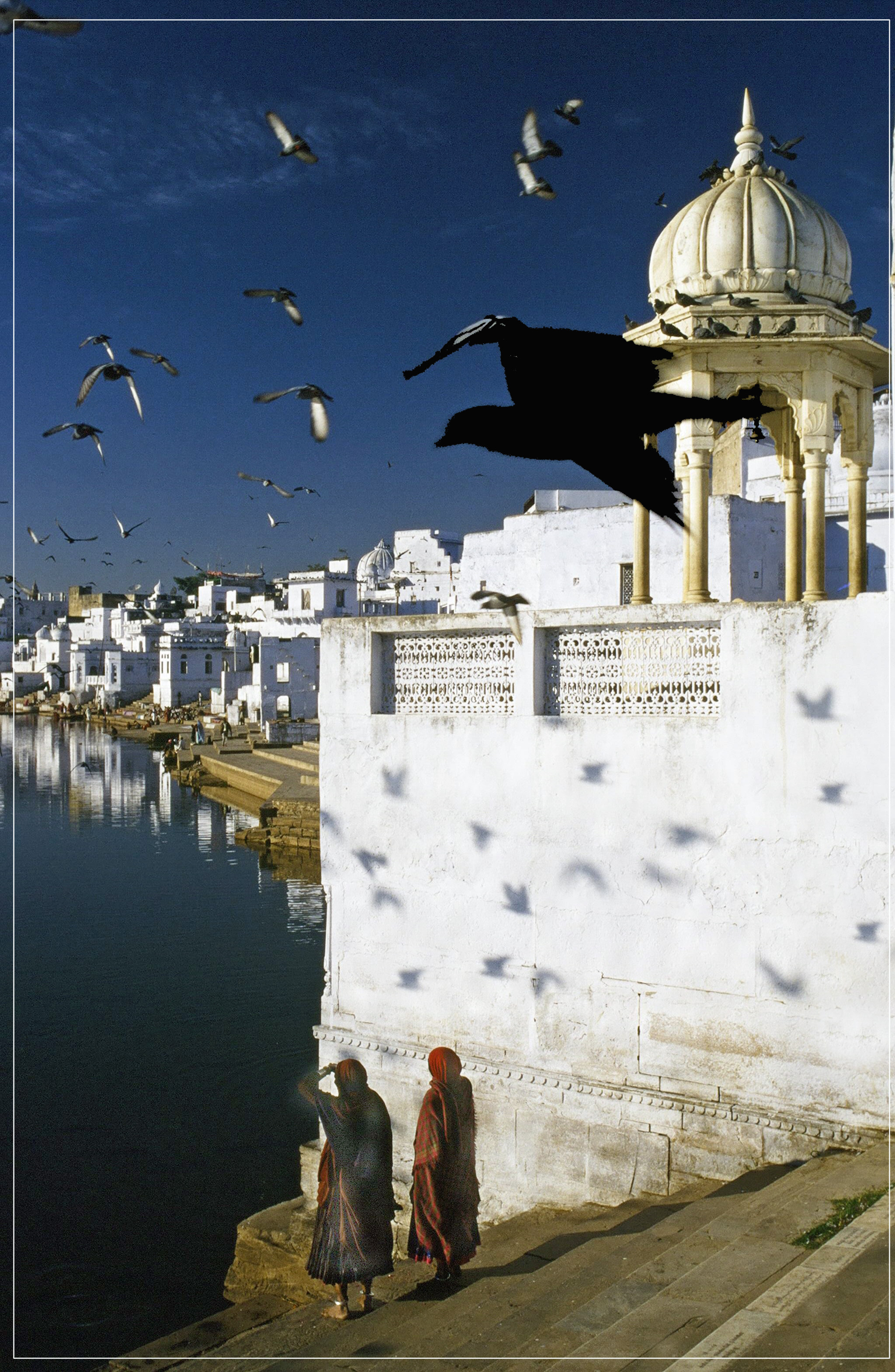
Early morning view of the ghats at the Pushkar Lake.

According to the Hindu scripture Padma Purana, Brahma saw the demon Vajranabha (Vajranash in another version) trying to kill his children and harassing people. He immediately slew the demon with his weapon, the lotus-flower. In this process, the lotus petals fell on the ground at three places, where springs emerged creating three lakes: the Pushkar Lake or Jyeshta Pushkar (greatest or first Pushkar), the Madya Pushkar (middle Pushkar) Lake, and Kanishta Pushkar (lowest or youngest Pushkar) lake. When Brahma came down to the earth, he named the place where the flower ("pushpa") fell from Brahma's hand ("kar") as "Pushkar". It is also said that the sacred Sarasvati River emerged at Pushkar as five streams. The three lakes were assigned their presiding deities as the Hindu Trinity Brahma, Vishnu and Shiva, respectively. When Brahma came down to the earth, he named the place where the lotus fell as 'Pushkar'. Brahma then decided to perform a yagna at the place, at the main Pushkar Lake. However, his wife Savitri (called Sarasvati in some versions) could not be present at the designated time to perform the essential part of the yagna. Brahma, therefore, married a Gujjar, a dominant agricultural race named Gayatri and completed the yagna with his new consort sitting beside him. However, when Savitri finally arrived at the venue, she found Gayatri sitting next to Brahma in her rightful place. Agitated, she cursed Brahma that he would be worshipped only in Pushkar. As a result of this, yagna performed in the presence of all the gods, it is said that a dip in the lake created at this place is credited with holiness, assuring salvation from all sins. It is now one of the five holiest centres of pilgrimage for Hindus.

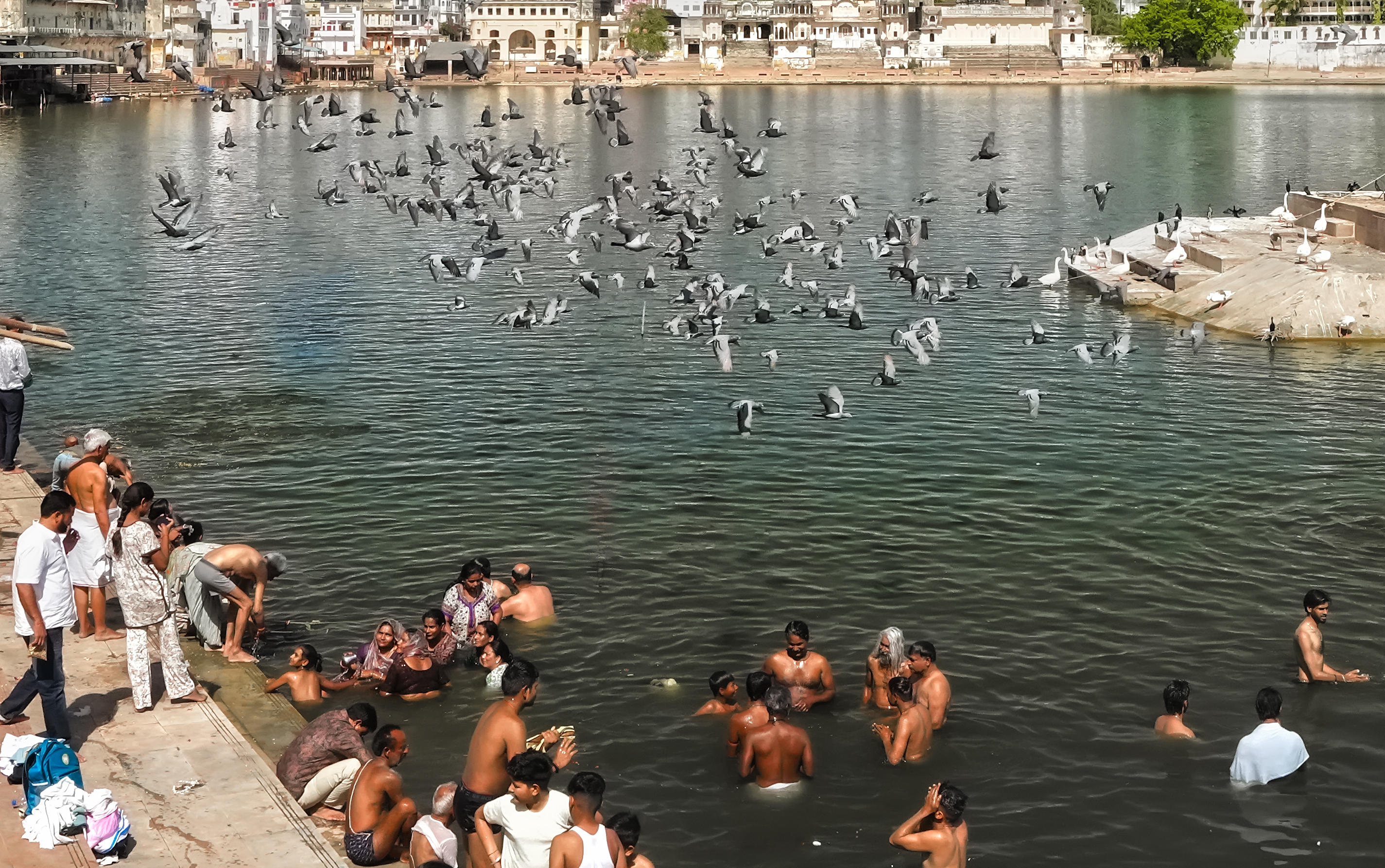
People taking holy dip at Puskar Lake in Rajasthan, India

Ramayana and Mahabharata refer to Pushkar Lake as Adi Tirtha, or the "original sacred water-body". The famous Sanskrit poet and play-writer Kalidasa also referred to this lake in his poem Abhijñānaśākuntalam. The Ramayana mentions that Vishwamitra performed penance at Pushkar Lake for a thousand years. In spite of Brahma appearing before him and granting him the higher status of a rishi instead of a royal-sage (rajarishi), Vishwamitra continued his penance, but, the celestial nymph apsara, Menaka came to the lake to take a bath. Vishwamitra was enamoured by her beauty and they decided to live together in pursuit of pleasure for ten years. Then, Vishwamitra realized that his main activity of penance was disturbed. He, therefore, took leave of Menaka and went away to the north to continue his meditation. Vishwamitra was also described as building the Brahma temple at Pushkar after Brahma's yagna. Mahabharata mentions that Pushkar is a holy place of the god Vishnu, considered as the Adi Tirtha where millions of tirthas united during sunrise and sunset, and visiting the lake and taking a holy bath in the lake would wash off all sins.

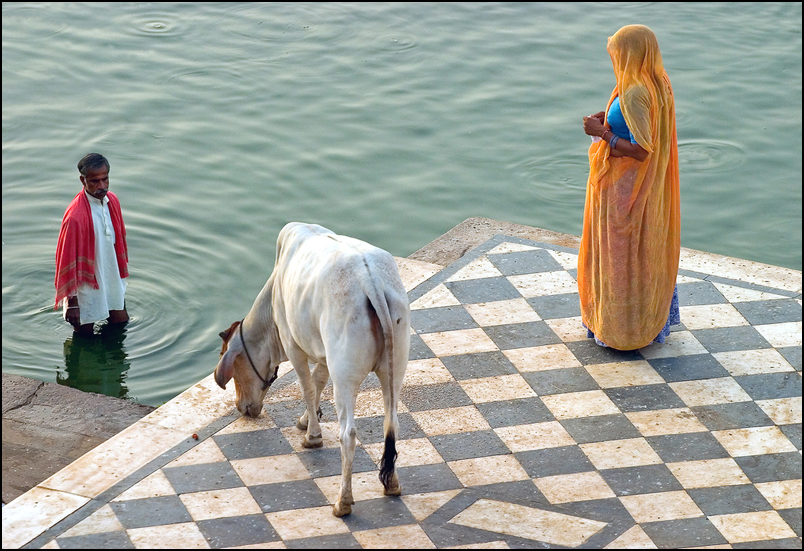
Morning view of one of the ghats on the lake

According to Hindu theology, there are five sacred lakes collectively called Panch-Sarovar ('Sarovar' means "lake"). Namely, Mansarovar, Bindu Sarovar, Narayan Sarovar, Pampa Sarovar and Pushkar Sarovar; hence, Pushkar is considered one of the most sacred places in India. It is also the belief of devotees that a dip in the waters of the lake on Kartik Poornima would equal the benefits that would accrue by performing yagnas (fire-sacrifices) for several centuries. Pushkar is often called "Tirtha-Raj" – the king of pilgrimage sites related to water-bodies. The scriptures also mention that doing parikrama (circumambulation) of the three lakes (the main Pushkar, Madya Pushkar where there is a Hanuman temple and an old Banyan tree, and Kanistha Pushkar where a Krishna temple exists), which cover a distance of 16 kilometres (9.9 mi), during the Kartik Poornima day would be highly auspicious. International Business Times has identified Pushkar as one of the ten most religious places in the world and one of the five sacred pilgrimage places for the Hindus, in India.

== Cultural attractions ==
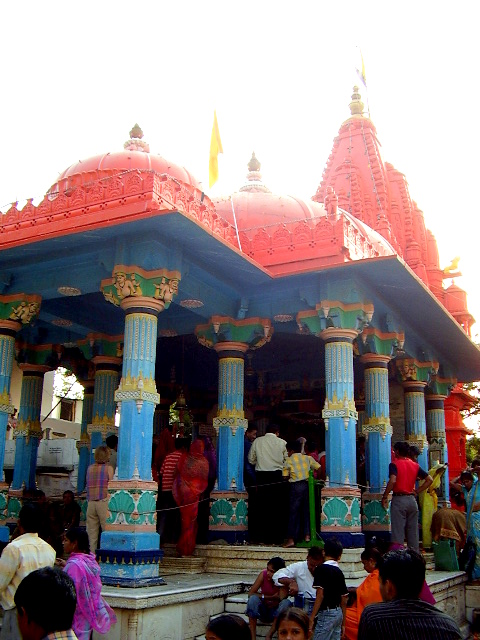
The Brahma temple at Pushkar

Pushkar Lake and its precincts offer a plethora of monuments of national importance, such as the Pushkar city, the Brahma temple at Pushkar and the ghats on the periphery of the lakes. The lake is the central divine theme for the popularity of all the monuments seen in the town and the fairs held here.

=== Pushkar city ===
Pushkar city, with a population of 14,791 at the 2001 census, is one of the oldest cities in India. The city lies on the shore of Pushkar Lake. The date of its actual origin is not known, but legend associates Brahma with its creation concurrent with the lake; Brahma is said to have performed penance here for a darshan (sight) of god Vishnu. Thus, its uniqueness lies in the fact of its historic-religious-cultural background, and as a result it attracts approximately 100,000 visitors every month, apart from the very large congregation that occurs during the annual Pushkar Fair. However, Pushkar Lake is central to its sustenance as a religious centre. The tourist arrivals during 2005 were reported to be about 16.12 million (said to be the maximum among all tourist attractions in Rajasthan), out of which the foreign tourists were about 63,000.

=== Temples ===
Apart from the sacred Lake, Pushkar is said to have over 500 temples (80 are large and the rest are small); of these many old temples were destroyed or desecrated by Muslim depredations during Aurangzeb's rule (1658–1707) but were re-built subsequently. The most important of these is the Brahma temple. Though the current structure dates to the 14th century, the original temple is believed to be 2000 years old. Pushkar is often described in the scriptures as the only Brahma temple in the world, owing to the curse of Savitri, but also as the "King of the sacred places of the Hindus". Although now the Pushkar temple does not remain the only Brahma temple, it is still one of very few existing temples dedicated to Brahma in India as well as the most prominent. Hindu pilgrims, including holy men and sages visit this temple after taking a ceremonial sacred bath in the Pushkar Lake. Other notable temples around the lake include Varaha temple – dedicated to Varaha (the boar incarnation of god Vishnu), Savitri temple and Gayatri temple, dedicated to the consorts of Brahma.

=== Ghats ===
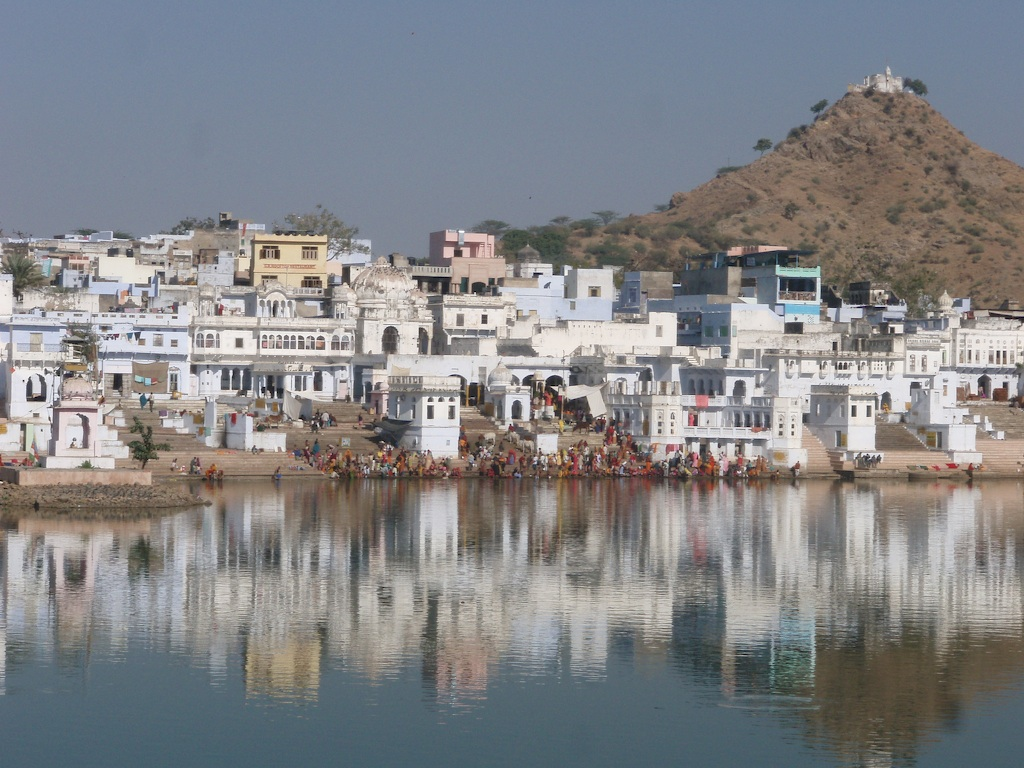
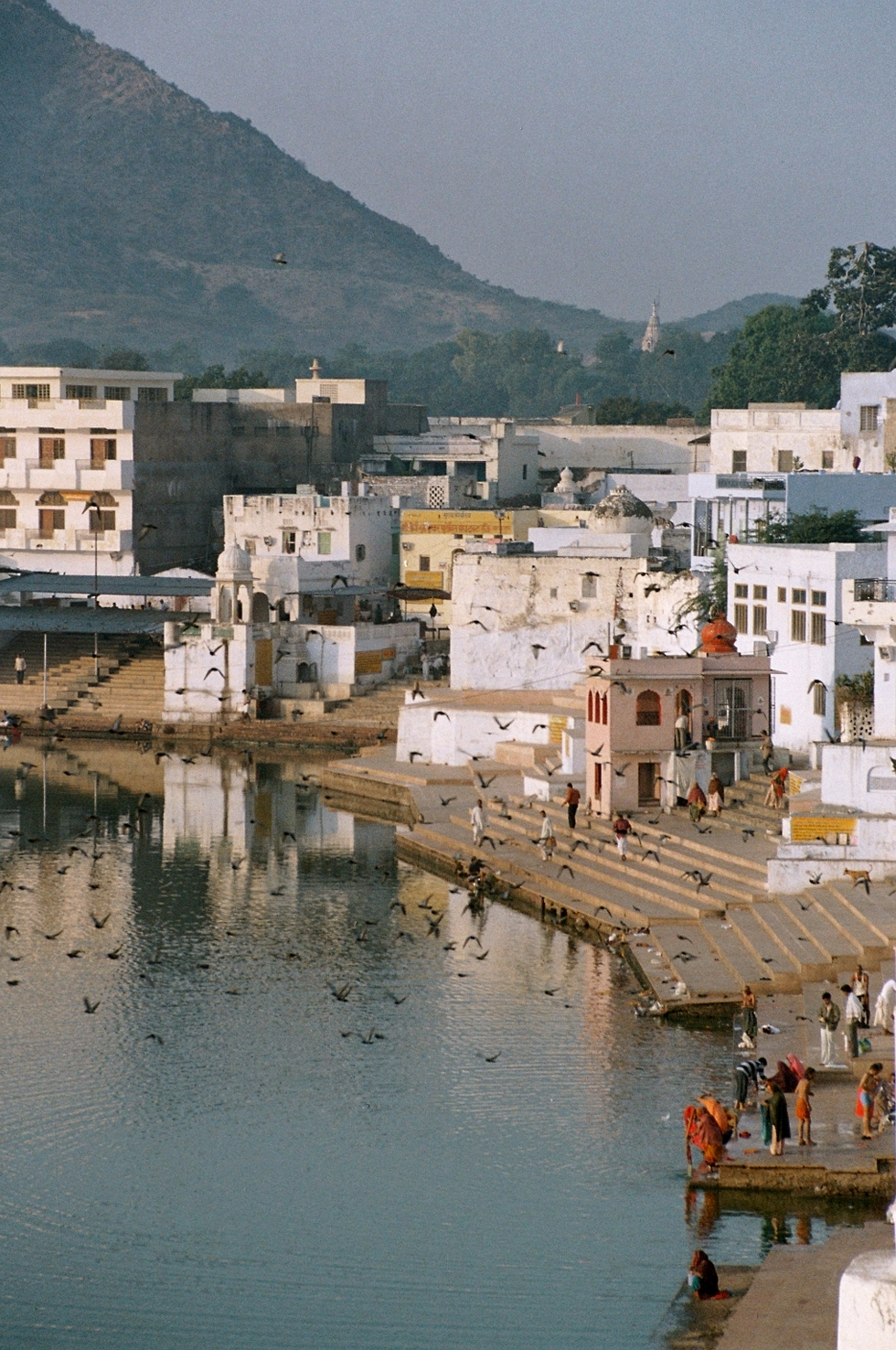
Left: Bathing Ghats on Pushkar Lake. Right: A view of the ghats at the Pushkar Lake

Ghats (stone steps laid on a gradual bank slope to descend to the lake edge) at Pushkar are integral to the lake. Ghats are also used for sacred bathing and rites, such as ancestor worship. Out of 52 ghats used by pilgrims to take a holy bath in the lake, ten important ghats on the periphery of the lake, which have other contiguous ghats adjoining them, have also been declared as 'Monuments of National Importance'. These ghats are: the Varaha Ghat, the Dadhich Ghat, Saptarishi Ghats, Gwalior Ghat, Kota Ghat, Gau ghat, Yag Ghat, Jaipur Ghat, Karni Ghat and Gangaur Ghat. These ghats, as well as the sacred Pushkar Lake (which is also a declared heritage monument), have been refurbished over the centuries by the Royal families of Rajasthan and by the Maratha kings. These are now undergoing further works as part of a heritage improvement programme launched with funds provided by the Government of Rajasthan and several departments of the Government of India. There are strict codes to be followed while taking a bath in the ghats, such as removing shoes away from the ghats and avoiding the passing of unwarranted comments about Hindu religious beliefs by non-Hindus, since the ghats and the temples are linked to the divine lake. The sacred water of the lake is said to be curative of many skin diseases. Local belief is that water around each ghat has a special curative power. While many ghats have been named after the Rajas who built them, some ghats have particular importance. Varaha ghat is so named since Vishnu appeared here in his incarnation of a boar (Varaha). Brahma Ghat is so named since Brahma bathed here. The Gau Ghat was renamed as Gandhi Ghat after Mahatma Gandhi's ashes were immersed at this ghat. Nart Singh Ghat, close to Varaha Ghat, has a stuffed crocodile on display.

A coinage known as "Puskar Passport" used by visitors to the lake and the ghats denotes the red thread that is tied on the wrists of pilgrims by the priests (for a dakshina – an unspecified fee). This indicates that the pilgrim has visited Pushkar Lake and is usually not approached by priests again for further rites and fees.

== Pushkar Fair ==
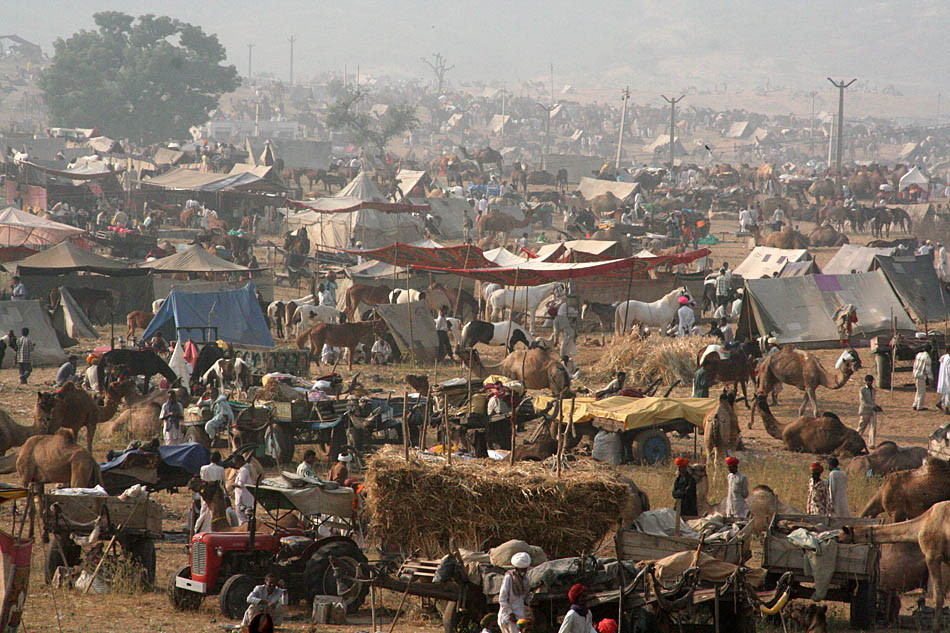
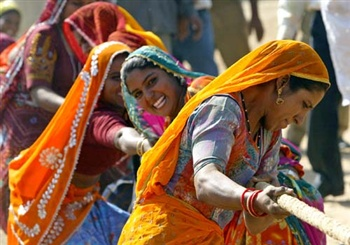
Left: Puskar Mela, 2006. Right: Women enjoying the tug of war

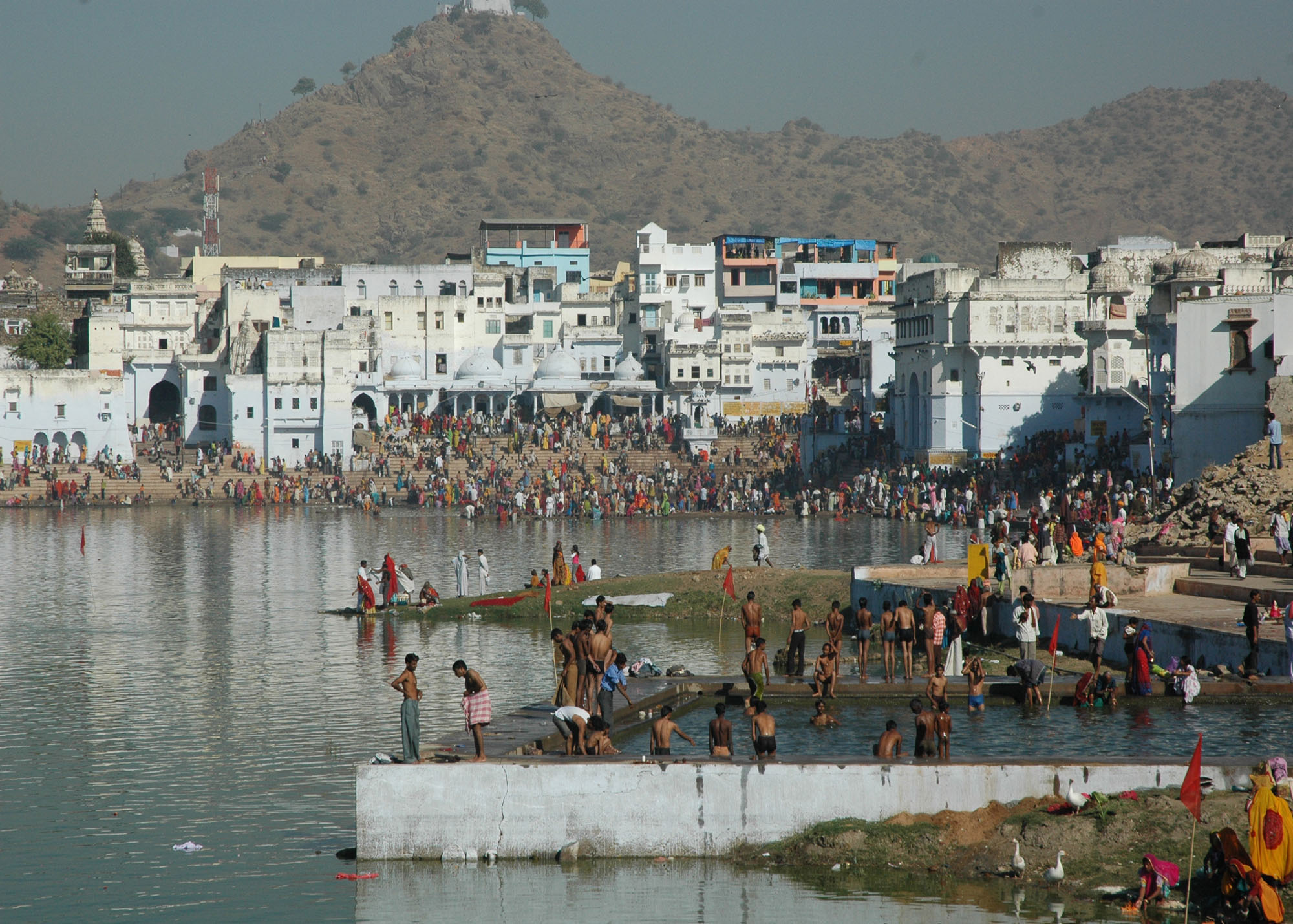
The devotees are taking a holy dip at Pushkar lake on the occasion of Kartik Purnima on 24 November 2007

Pushkar Lake and its precincts become very heavily populated during the annual Pushkar Fair or Pushkar mela, which has both a religious as well as an economic aspect. During the fair, a very large gathering of pilgrims takes a holy dip in the lake and the camel fair is an adjunct celebration. Pushkar Fair commences on Prabodhini Ekadashi, the 11th lunar day in the bright fortnight and ends on Kartik Poornima – the full Moon day in the month of Kartik (October–November), the latter being the most important day of the fair. This fair is held in the honour of god Brahma. A ritual bath on Kartik Poornima in the Pushkar Lake is considered to lead one to salvation. It is believed circling the three Pushkars on Kartik Poornima is highly meritorious. Sadhus, Hindu holy men, gather here and stay from the Ekadashi to full moon day in caves. The Pushkar fair is also Asia's largest camel fair. The colourful and lively Camel Fair reportedly attracts 2 lakh people and 50,000 camels. In this fair held on the banks of the lake, camels are very colourfully decorated and paraded in the sand dunes on the southern part of the lake. Tribes from several neighbouring villages are seen in their traditional colourful costumes. The fair on Kartik Poornima, the day when Brahma is believed to have concluded his Yagna establishing the lake. It is organized by the Rajasthan Tourism Development Corporation (RTDC), Pushkar Municipal Board and the Animal Husbandry Department of Rajasthan. The fair is a colourful cultural event also with folk dances, music, camel races, and the cattle fair. The tug of war is a popular entertaining sport held during the fair. This event is held between the Rajasthanis and foreigners; locals invariably win the event.

== Status and conservation issues ==
The natural environment of Pushkar Lake and its precincts has become increasingly degraded in the last few decades. The problems arise primarily from the over development of tourist facilities as well as the deforestation of the surrounding area.

The critical issues related to the conservation of the lake have been identified as:

- Siltation during the rainy season due to soil erosion of the denuded hills and inappropriate agricultural practices flowing through the three feeder streams namely, the Gomukh, the Nag Pahar and Savitri.
- Shifting sand dunes from hills and surrounding areas causing a rise of the bed level of the lake.
- Upstream interception by farmers through check dams for farming practices causing reduction in inflows. This reduction is reflected in the full reservoir level of 8.53 metres (28.0 ft) not being achieved during most years, resulting in pilgrim displeasure and the reduction in maximum depth of the lake, reported now as only 4.6 metres (15 ft).
- Large inflow of sewage from the ghats and the surrounding habitation has caused serious water pollution.
- Alarming rate of fall in groundwater level has occurred in the vicinity of the lake due to high extraction for various uses.

In recent years, storage in the Pushkar Lake has been reduced alarmingly, leaving only a small puddle of water in many years during the festival season when pilgrims flock to the lake for sacred bathing during the Hindu holy month of Kartik, when the Pushkar Fair is held. During the 2009 Pushkar fair, the situation became very grim when the lake dried up entirely. Alternate arrangements were made to facilitate sacred bathing by providing water in concrete tanks near one of the upper ghats, fed by tube wells from groundwater sources. While the authorities have been blamed for poor planning by de-silting the lake, the drought situation has resulted in insignificant rainfall in the area to fill the lake.

=== Water quality issues ===
The lake does not meet the National Water Quality Standards due to its high concentration of Biochemical Oxygen Demand (BOD). Considering the adverse impact on the lake water quality due to Eutrophication, anthropogenic pressures and holy rituals and tourism, a water quality study was specifically undertaken at four sites on a monthly basis for six months. The sampling sites were chosen to represent the pressure of pilgrims and other pollution inflows at the locations. The water samples were analysed for temperature, pH, salinity, conductivity, total dissolved solids, alkalinity, hardness, turbidity, dissolved oxygen, chloride, nitrite, nitrate, phosphate, sulphate, sodium, ammonium, potassium, total chlorophyll, biochemical oxygen demand and chemical oxygen demand. The analysis over the period has revealed that the lake water was alkaline, chloride and conductivity concentrations were high at all the four sites, and there were lower levels of dissolved oxygen (at sites with greater pollution load) and high hardness (on account of excess of calcium and magnesium from surface run-off). During the period of the annual Pushkar Fair, a distinct co-relationship was discerned between various parameters analysed and the degree of water pollution in the lake. This has called for urgent remedial actions to be undertaken by all of the government agencies involved with the lake management, with people's participation.

=== Restoration works ===
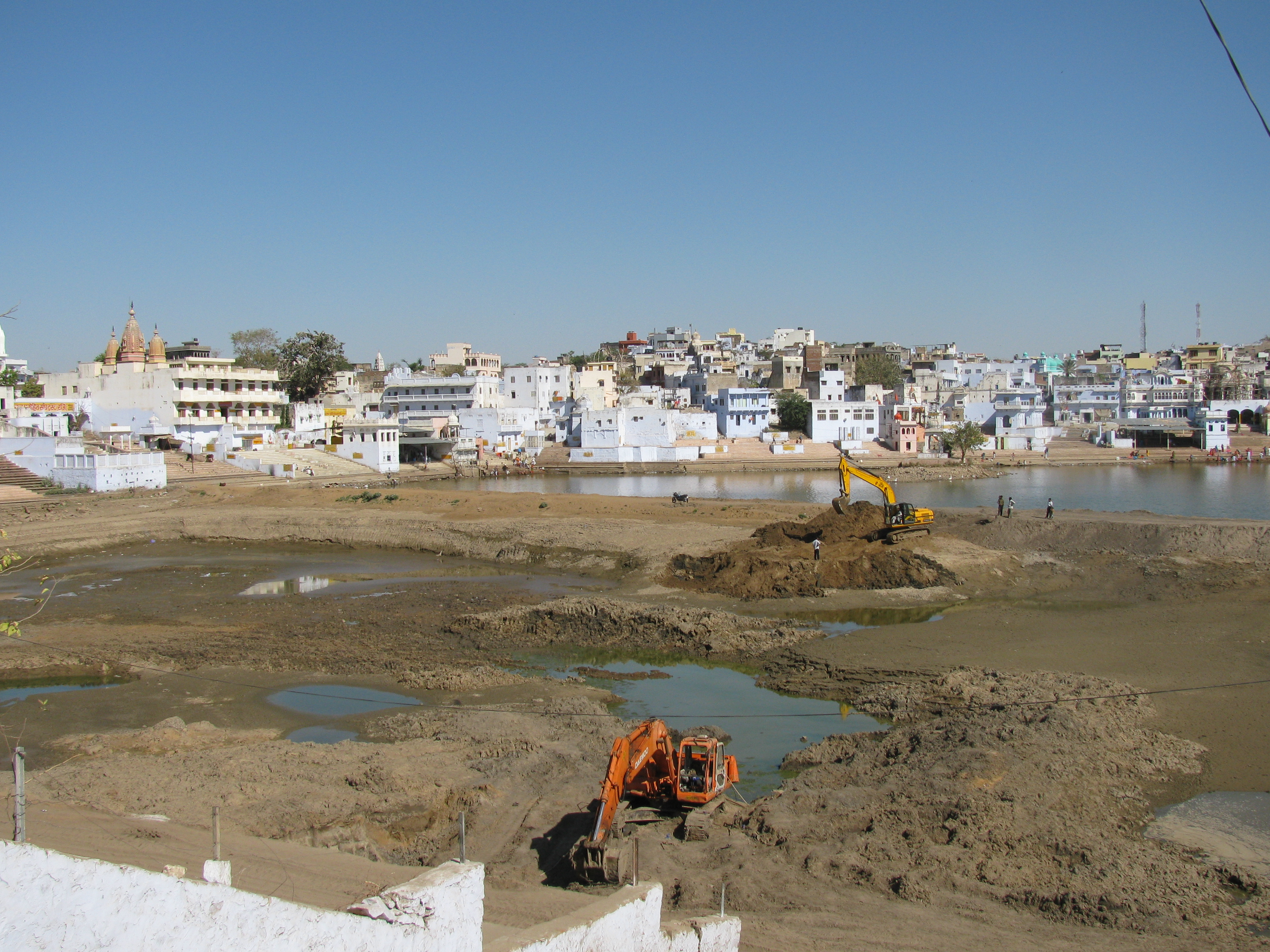
Pushkar Lake being dredged to fight silting

To supplement water supply to the lake, even as early as in 1993, the government built 12 deep tube wells to supplement water supply to the lake. However, most tube wells were dysfunctional, thereby aggravating the problem. The Union Ministry for Environment and Forests included Pushkar Lake on a list of five lakes under the National Lake Conservation Project (NLCP) for restoration. They have been providing funds since 2008 for the restoration works, but the situation has not eased.

Development plans are under various stages of implementation to address the critical issues related to the lake. They aim to improve water quality, increase water storage capacity, prevent encroachment of the lake periphery, improve the ambiance around the lake, as well as to introduce recreational and revenue generating schemes.

Sewage outfalls into the lake are proposed to be completely stopped by the interception and diversion of feeder lines. Lining the main feeders into the lake and setting up water treatment plants to continuously treat and recirculate the lake water are also envisioned. Conservation measures proposed for adoption to clean the lake are by way of desilting, water treatment at inlet of feeders into the lake, construction of check dams, conservation of ghats, afforestation of denuded hills in the catchment, soil moisture conservation measures, stabilization of sand dunes by planting vegetation of suitable species of plants and restriction of cultivation in the bed of feeder channels. In addition, the institutional measures considered for effecting improvement of the lake are mass awareness programmes with the population's participation as well as the control of fish proliferation to reduce the risk of death of fishes during periods of inadequate water depth in the lake.

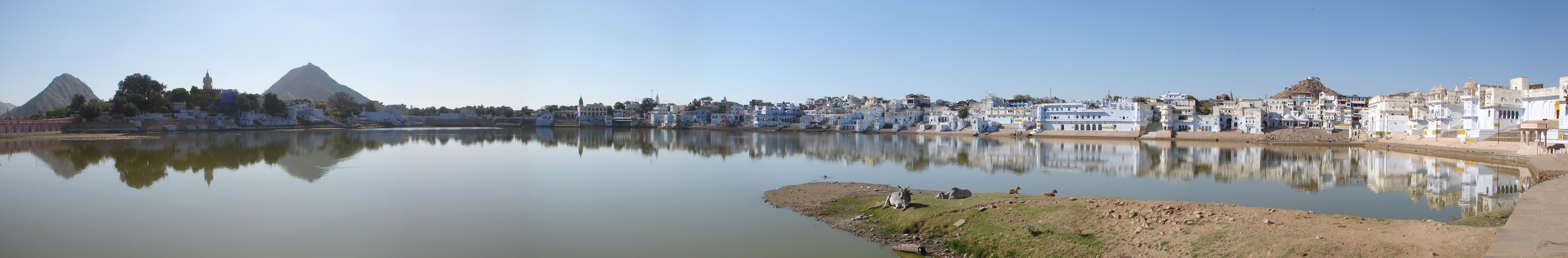
Panorama of Pushkar Lake

== See also ==
- List of lakes in India
- Soda lake
