= Parashar =

Notable people bearing the name Parashar include:

- Amol Parashar - Indian actor
- Deepak Parashar - Indian actor and former model
- Narain Chand Parashar - Indian parliamentarian, professor, linguist and writer.
- Pankuj Parashar - Indian film and television director
- Prastuti Parashar - Indian actress from Assam
- Rick Parashar - American record producer, recording engineer and musician
- Sat Parashar - Indian financial management expert and business education administrator
- Susheel Parashar - Indian actor
- Vijay P. Parashar - Oral and maxillofacial radiologist

== See also ==
- Indian surnames
