= Pushkar Fair =

Camel, horse, cattle trading fair with cultural events

Pushkar Fair Kartik Mela
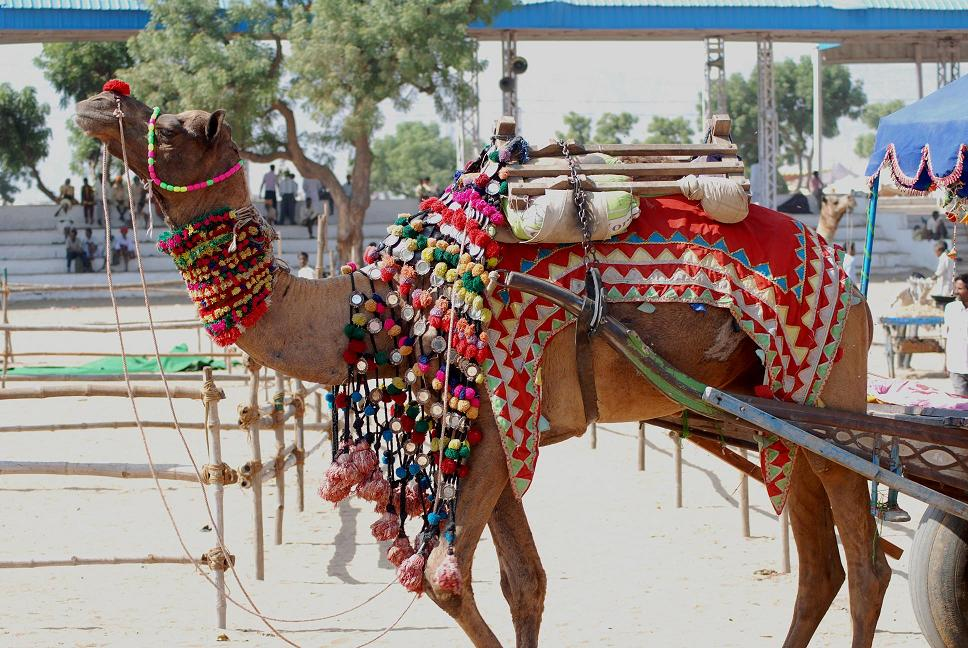
- A Camel cart at the Pushkar Fair
- Genre: Livestock, cultural festival
- Dates: start of Kartik (month) to Kartik Purnima; Peak: last 5 days
- Frequency: Annually
- Locations: Pushkar, Ajmer district, Rajasthan, India
- Coordinates: 26.487652°N 74.555922°E
- Country: India
- Participants: Farmers, Hindu pilgrims, Tourists (domestic, foreign)
- Attendance: > 200,000
- Major events: Fête, livestock show (camels, horses, cows), dance, rural sports, ferris wheels, competitions

The Pushkar Fair, also called the Pushkar Camel Fair or locally as Kartik Mela or Pushkar ka Mela is an annual multi-day livestock fair and cultural fête held in the town of Pushkar in Ajmer district, Rajasthan, India. The fair starts with the Hindu calendar month of Kartik and ends on the Kartik Purnima, which typically overlaps with late October and early November in the Gregorian calendar. In 1998, over 1 million visitors came to Pushkar throughout the year. The Pushkar fair alone attracts over 200,000 visitors.

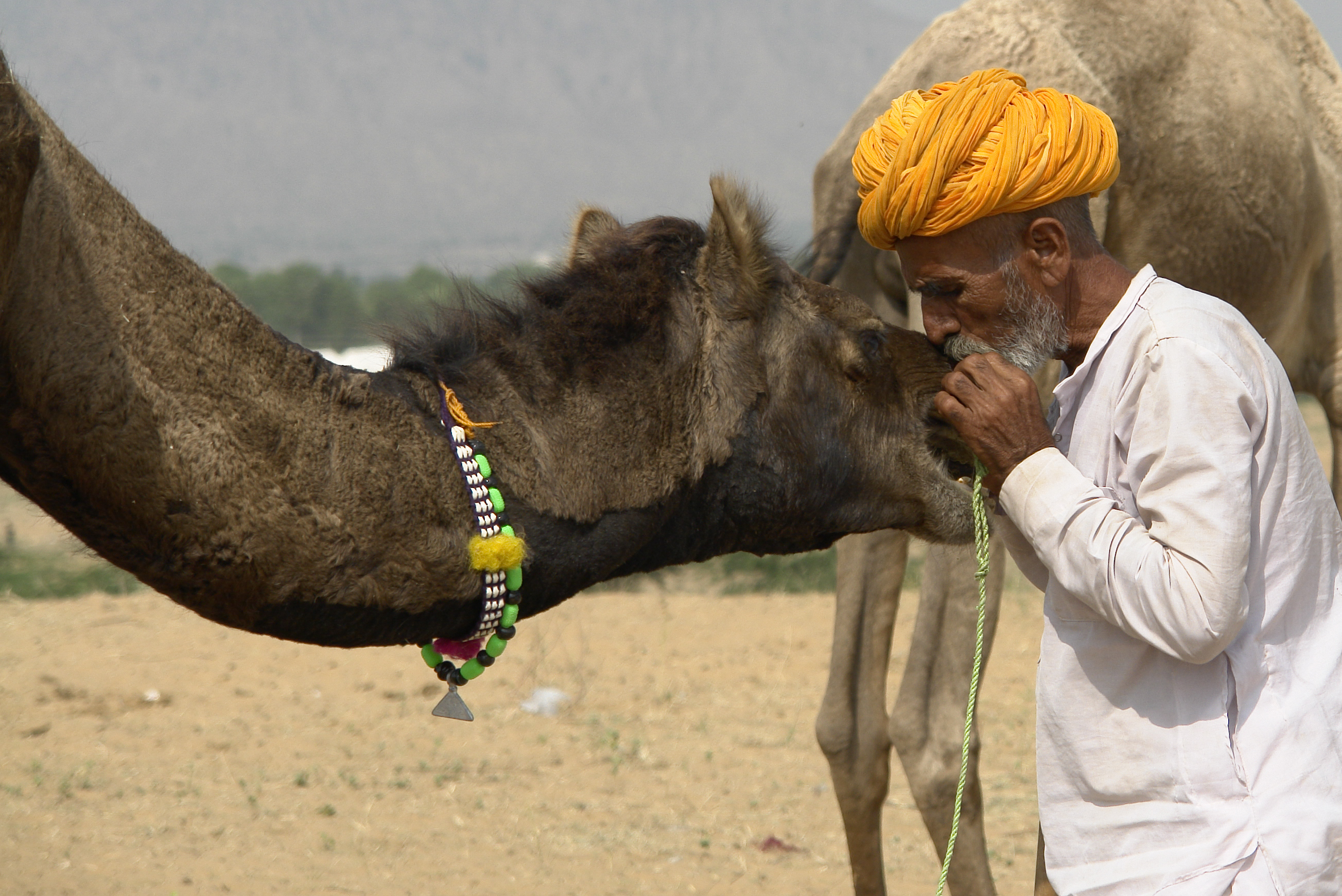
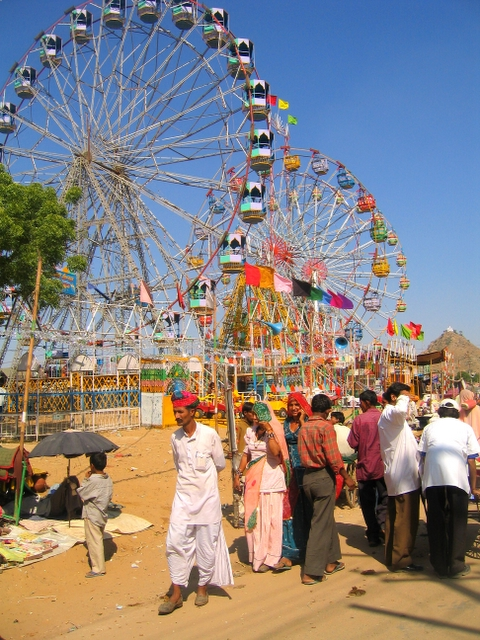
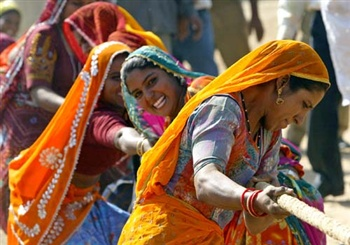
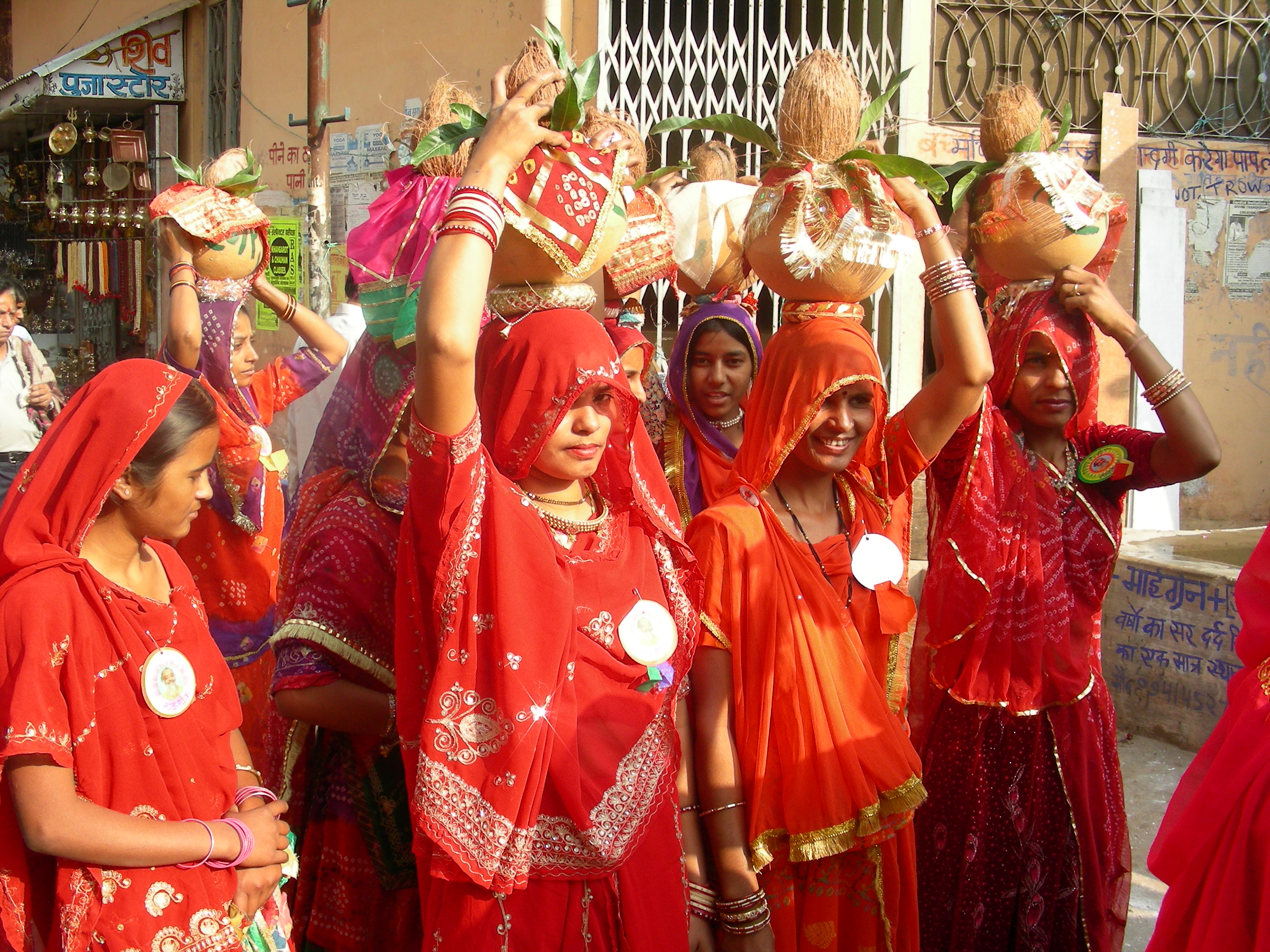
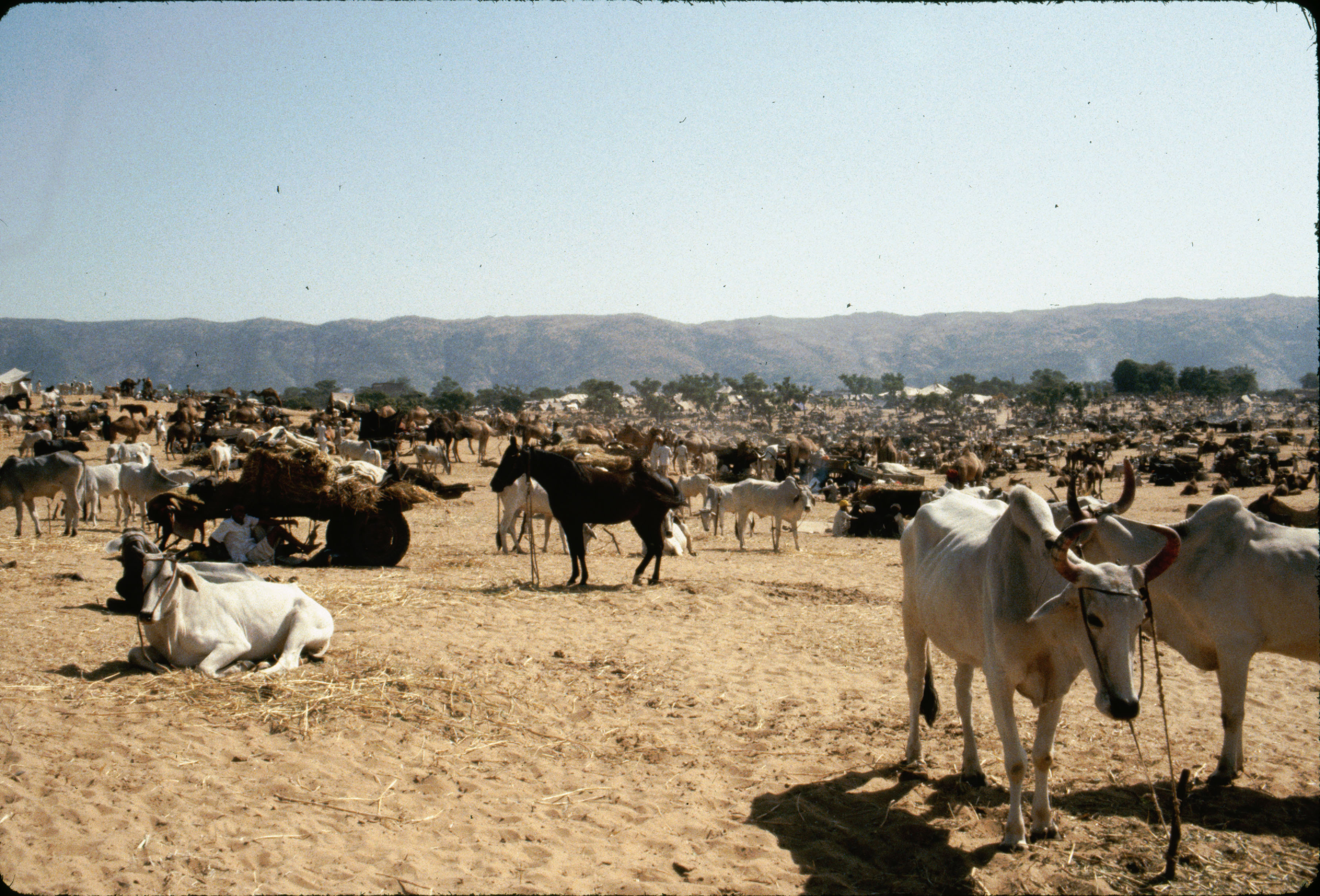
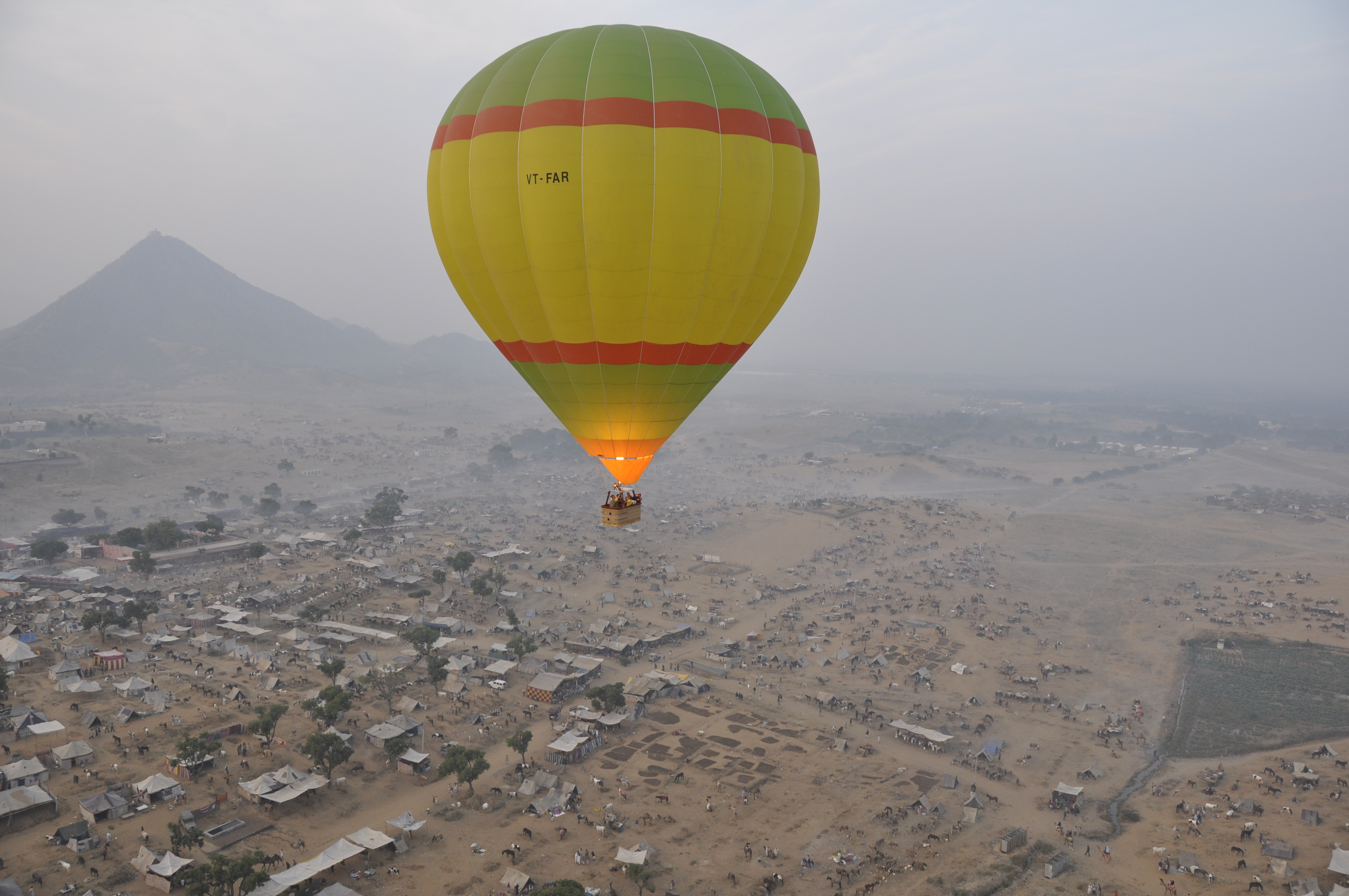
Pushkar fair attracts nearly 200,000 visitors.

The Pushkar fair is one of India's largest camel, horse and cattle fairs. Apart from the trading of livestock, it is an important pilgrimage season for Hindus to the Pushkar lake. Pushkar fair has also become a significant tourist attraction for domestic and international travellers, given the cooler season, the abundance of colourful cultural themes. Cultural events and competitions include dances, tug of war between women's teams as well as men's teams, the "matka phod", "longest moustache" competition, "bridal competition", camel races and others.

Thousands of people go to the banks of the Pushkar Lake where the fair takes place. Men trade their livestock, which includes camels, horses, cows, sheep and goats. Rural families shop at the handicraft stalls full of bracelets, clothes, textiles and fabrics. A camel race starts off the festival, with music, songs and exhibitions to follow. Between these events, the most awaited is the test of how the camel is able to bring the items. In order to demonstrate, the men go up on the group of camels one after another.

Pushkar is in centre-east part of Rajasthan, on the western side of Aravalli mountains. The nearest airport from Pushkar is Kishangarh Airport in Ajmer, about 40 km (25 mi) northeast. Jaipur is well connected with all the major cities in India. Pushkar is about 10 km (6.2 mi) from Ajmer, connected via Pushkar road (Highway 58) which goes over the Aravalli Range mountains. Ajmer is also the nearest major railway station. Pushkar Railway Station is connected to Ajmer Railway Station.

== Crowd ==
Around 500,000-600,000 people visit Pushkar during the main Pushkar festival.

== See also ==
- Sonepur Cattle Fair
