= Pushkar =

- City
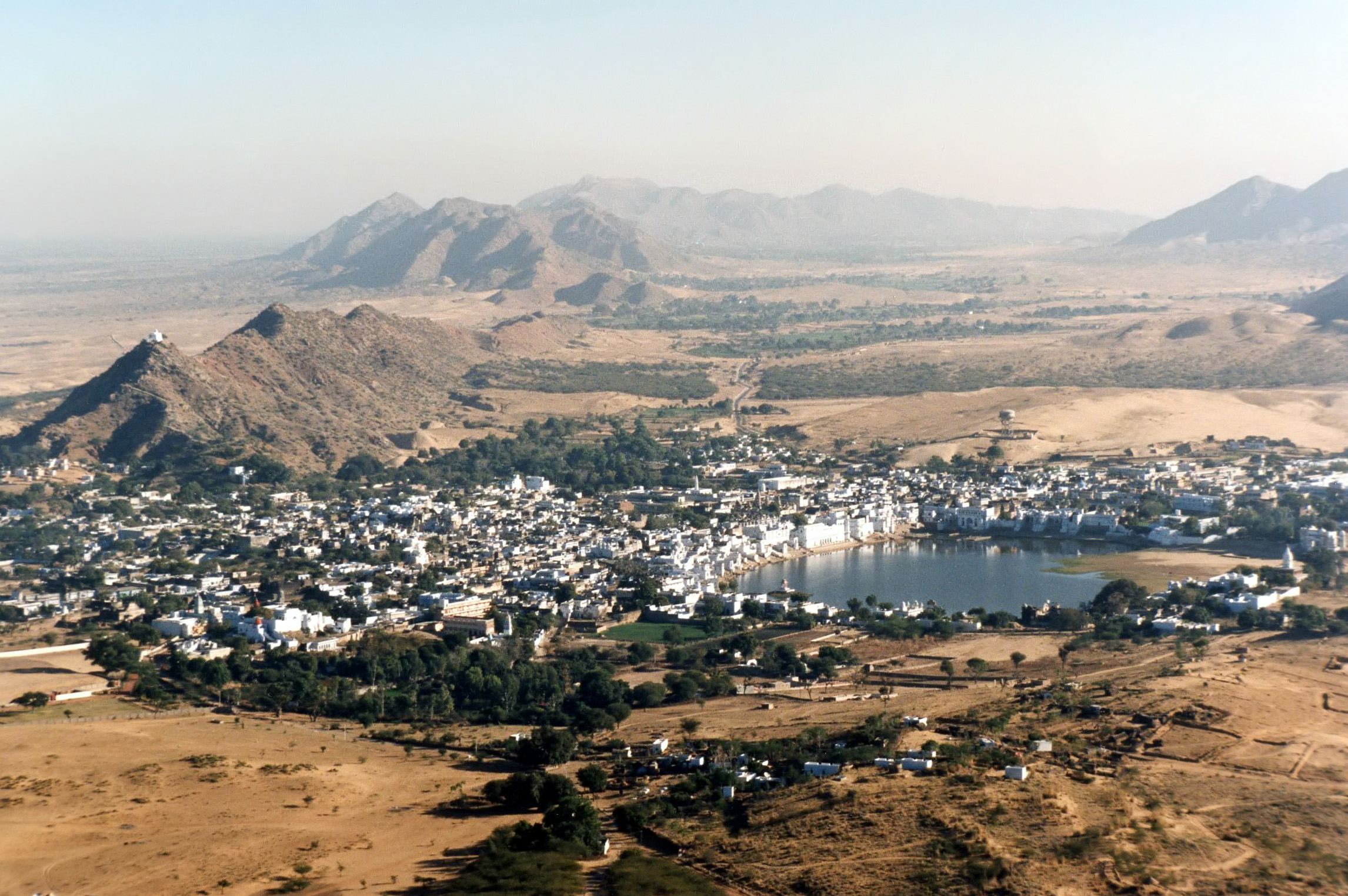
- Pushkar, Ajmer district, Rajasthan aerial view
- Nickname: Tirtha Raj ("King of Pilgrimage Sites")
- Location in Rajasthan, India Pushkar (India)
- Coordinates: 26.487652°N 74.555922°E
- Country: India
- State: Rajasthan
- District: Ajmer
- Elevation: 510 m (1,670 ft)

Population (2011)
  - Total: 21,626

Languages
  - Official: Hindi, Rajasthani
- Time zone: UTC+5:30 (IST)

Pushkar is an ancient temple town located on the shore of Pushkar Lake near Ajmer City and headquarters of Pushkar tehsil in the Ajmer district in the Indian state of Rajasthan. It is situated about 10 km (6.2 mi) northwest of Ajmer and about 150 km (93 mi) southwest of Jaipur. The town lies at an elevation of about 510 metres (1,670 ft) and is surrounded by hills on three sides, with Nag Pahar ("Snake Mountain") forming a natural boundary between Ajmer and Pushkar.

Pushkar is among the oldest existing cities in India. According to Hindu tradition, Lord Brahma, regarded as the creator of the universe, dropped a lotus flower on the ground, which led to the formation of a lake. The place where the lotus fell came to be known as Pushkar, after the Sanskrit word for lotus. The town is home to one of the few temples dedicated to Brahma, and a pilgrimage to Pushkar is considered highly meritorious within Hinduism.

According to Hindu scriptures, Pushkar Lake is regarded as Tirtha Raj, or the "king of pilgrimage sites." It is believed that no pilgrimage is complete without bathing in its sacred waters. The lake is semi-circular in shape, with an estimated depth of 8–10 metres (26–33 ft), and is surrounded by 52 ghats. About 400 blue-colored temples surround the holy lake. It makes the atmosphere more spiritual and divine as one can listen to magical chants from temples along its perimeter.

The area is sometimes called the rose garden of Rajasthan because of the cultivation of roses whose essence is exported internationally. The city is noted for its mythological associations, temples, and heritage architecture.

Most of the temples and ghats in Pushkar are from the 18th century and later, because many temples were destroyed during Muslim conquests in the area. Subsequently, the destroyed temples were rebuilt. The most famous among Pushkar temples is the red spired Brahma Temple. It is considered a sacred city by the Hindus particularly in Shaktism, and meat and eggs consumption are forbidden in the city as are alcohol and drugs. There are many ghats where pilgrims bathe. Pushkar is also significant for its Gurdwaras for Guru Nanak and Guru Gobind Singh. One of the bathing ghats, Gobind ghat, was built by Sikhs in memory of Guru Gobind Singh.

Pushkar is famous for its annual fair (Pushkar Camel Fair) featuring a trading fete of cattle, horses and camels. It is held over seven days in autumn marking Kartika Purnima according to the Hindu calendar (Kartik (month), October or November). It attracts nearly 200,000 people. In 1998, Pushkar hosted about 1 million domestic (95%) and international tourists over the year.

== Etymology ==
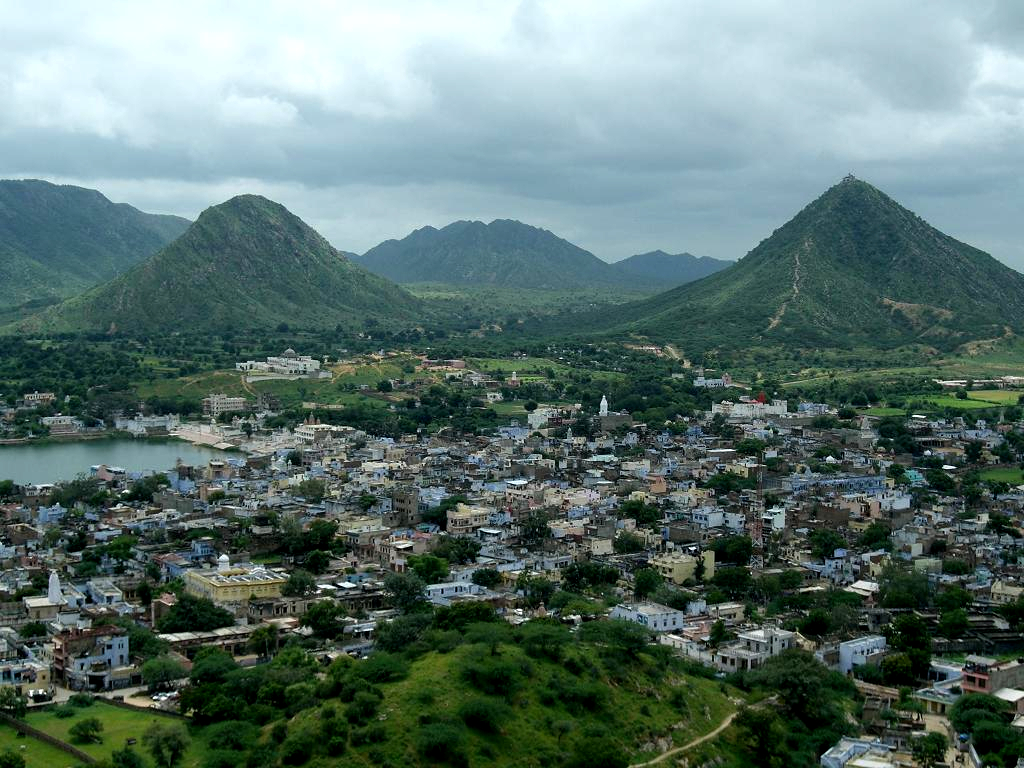
Pushkar seen after monsoons.

In Sanskrit, pushkara (पुष्कर) means "blue lotus flower."

== Location ==
Pushkar is in centre-east part of Rajasthan, on the western side of Aravalli mountains. The nearest airport from Pushkar is Kishangarh Airport in Kishangarh, about 45 km (28 mi) northeast. Pushkar is about 10 km (6.2 mi) from Ajmer, connected via Pushkar road (Highway 58) which goes over the Aravalli Range mountains. Ajmer is also the nearest major railway station.

=== Man Mahal ===
Raja Ram Singh constructed the grand mansion, which serves as the guest house and is one of the most visited spots in Pushkar. Man Mahal is famous for its Rajasthani architectural style which represents the royal period.

== Legend ==
Pushkar is believed to be the place where Brahma performed penance for a very long time and therefore is also one of the rare places which hosts a temple to the Hindu creator god. According to the Padma Purana, once Brahma decided to go to the earth and reaching the area of the present Pushkar, he entered that forest, full of many trees and creepers, adorned with many flowers, filled with the notes of many birds, crowded with groups of many beasts. Brahma was very pleased with the forests and trees and after remaining at Pushkar for a thousand years he threw a lotus on the ground which made the earth tremble to its core. The devas were also shaken and not knowing what had caused the upheaval, went to look for Brahma but could not find him. Vishnu told them the reason for the tremors and took them to Pushkar to meet Brahma. However they could not get a glimpse of him and Vayu and Brihaspati suggested them to meditate according to Vedic rites to be able to see Brahma. After a long time the creator-god became visible to them and asked them why they were so distressed. The devas told him about the tumult caused by his dropping the lotus from his hand and asked the reason for it. Brahma informed them that a demon named Vajranabha who used to take away the life of children was waiting there to kill the gods but Brahma brought about his destruction by dropping the lotus. Since he had dropped the lotus there, therefore that place would be known as Pushkara, a great, sanctifying holy place, giving religious merit.

== History ==
Pushkar is near some of the oldest geological structures in India. Microliths near Khera and Kaderi suggest the region was settled in ancient times. The Aravalli hills near it have yielded Mohenjodaro-style artifacts, but the connection is unclear as these items may have been transported later. Sites near it have been sources of ancient Brahmi script inscriptions, considered pre-Ashokan near village Badli. Local excavations have been a source of red ware and painted gray ware confirming ancient settlement.

Pushkar is mentioned in the Ramayana, the Mahabharata and the Puranas, suggesting its significance in historical and religious tradition of Hinduism. The city is mentioned in many texts dated to the 1st millennium. These texts are not, however, historical. The earliest historical records relating to Pushkar and Ajmer are found in Islamic texts describing the raids and conquest of northwestern regions of the Indian subcontinent.

The region finds mention in Mohammad Ghori's 1192 CE conquest related records, in the defeat of Prithviraj Chauhan. Thereafter, Pushkar and nearby Ajmer find mention in historical records related to Qutub-ud-din Aibak. It was regained by Hindus under the Chahamanas of Ranastambhapura in 1287, but regained by the Delhi Sultanate in 1301 and remained in Muslim control for many centuries. Akbar made the nearby Ajmer one of the provincial capitals, and it remained a part of the Mughal Empire until 1712 CE. The Muslim rule brought destruction as well as cultural influences. Aurangzeb's armies destroyed the Hindu temples along the lake. The cattle and camel trading tradition brought merchants from Afghanistan. With the collapse of Mughal Empire after Aurangzeb, Pushkar was regained by Hindus and became a part of Jodhpur State under the Rathores of Marwar who rebuilt the temples and ghats. Several important temples were rebuilt by the Marathas. The Brahma temple was rebuilt by Gokul Parak Oswal, the temple of Saraswati was rebuilt by the Purohit of Jodhpur, the temple of Badri Narayana was rebuilt by the Thakur of Kherwa, the temple of Varaha which had been destroyed by Jahangir was rebuilt by Maharaja Bakht Singh of Marwar and the Maratha Noble Goma Rao rebuilt the Shiva Atmateshwara Temple. In 1801, Pushkar came under British rule and remained a part of the British Raj until 1947.

In contemporary times, it has been the venue of the famed annual Pushkar Camel Fair.

== Demographics ==
Religion in Pushkar
Religion	Percent
Hinduism	94.5%
Islam	4.02%
Jainism	0.67%
Sikhism	0.31%
Others	0.50%

In 1901, the town was part of the Rajputana Agency had a population of 3,831.

According to 2011 India census, Pushkar had a population of 21,626. The town had 11,335 resident males and 10,291 females. Children in the 0–6 age group constituted 13.95% of the population. About 80% of the population including all age groups was literate (90% male literacy rate, 70% female). The town had over 4,250 houses, or about 5 residents on average per house.

== Festivals and landmarks ==
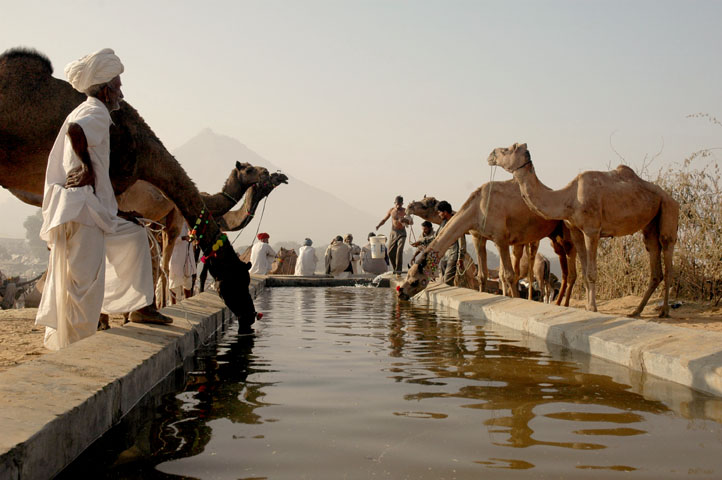
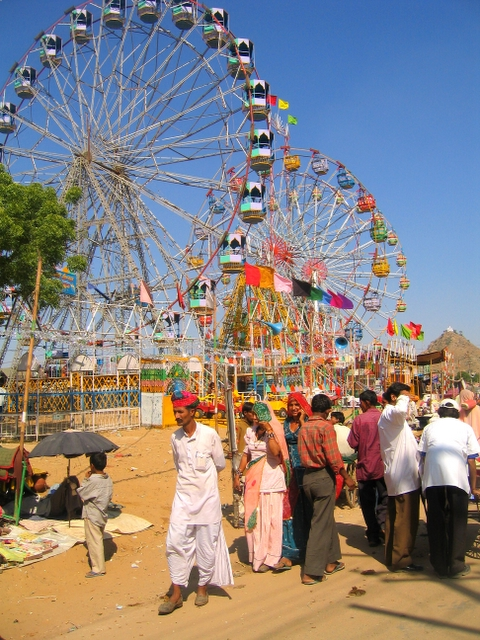
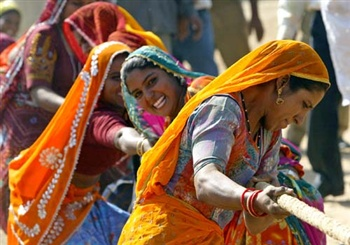
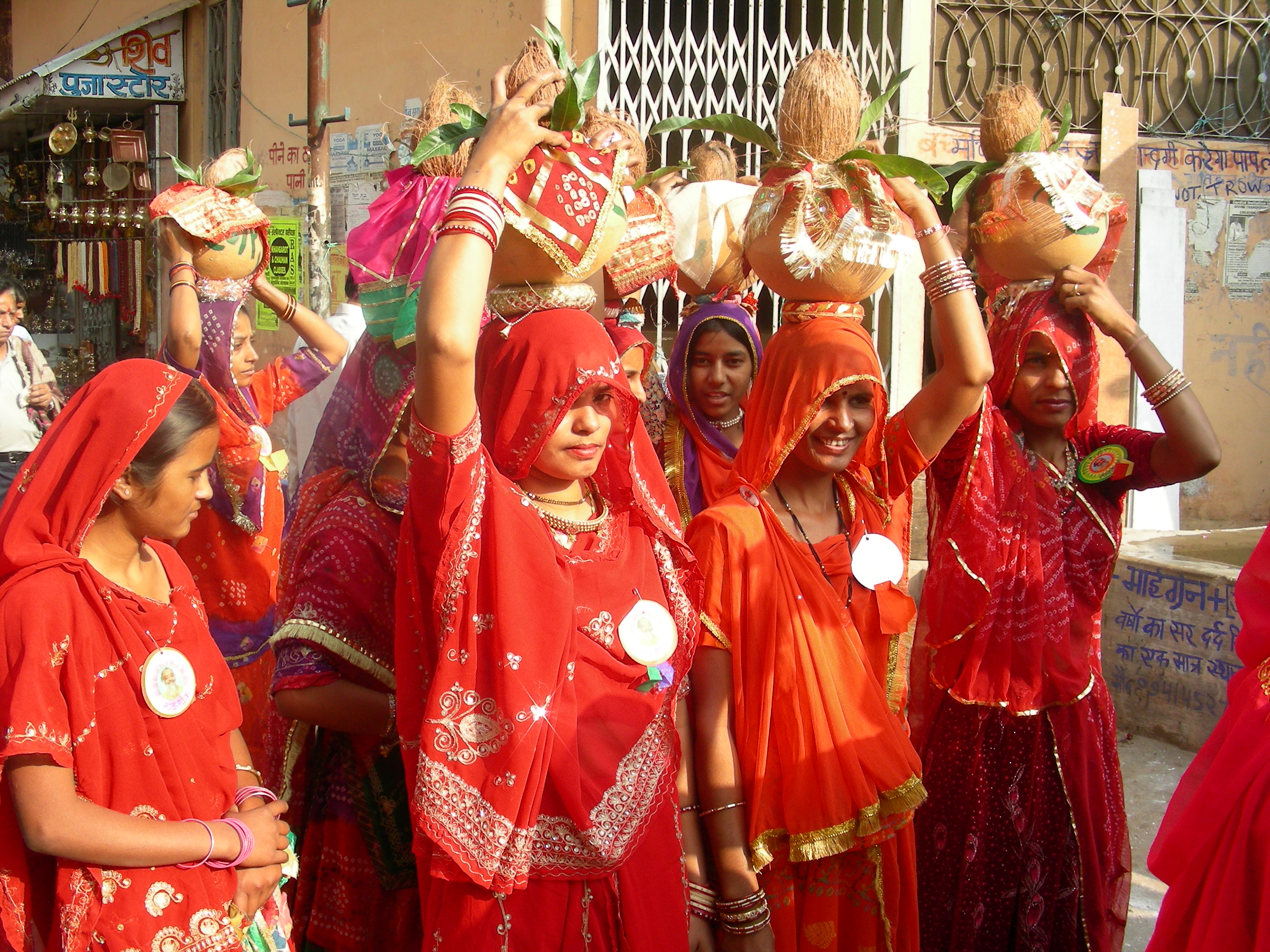
Pushkar fair attracts nearly 200,000 visitors over 7 days.

Brahma Temple (Jagatpita Brahma Mandir)

The most important temple in Pushkar is the temple of Brahma, one of the holy trinity of Hinduism. The temple enshrines a life-size idol of Brahma.

Pushkar Lake

The prime attraction of Pushkar is the Pushkar Lake which is considered sacred like the Mansarovar Lake in Tibet. Pushkar has become a place of Hindu pilgrimage because of this holy lake. Legend has it that this lake was consecrated to Brahma, the creator of the universe when a lotus dropped from his hand into the vale and a lake emerged in that place.

=== Pushkar Fair ===
Pushkar fair continues for five days and these five days are a period of relaxation and merry-making for the villagers. This fair time is the busiest time for them, as this is one of the largest cattle fairs in the country. Animals, including over 50,000 camels, are brought from distant places around to be traded and sold. All the camels are washed and adorned, some are shorn to form artistic patterns. Some camels, horses, and cows are colorfully decorated.

In addition to the animal trading market, Pushkar in parallel holds a festival of folk music and dances, ferris wheels, magic shows, horse and camel races and various other traditional sports and team entertainment competitions. While the Pushkar fair is held around the Kartik Purnima that typically overlaps between late October and early November, other seasons feature other sports and festivals for pilgrims who visit the sacred lake.

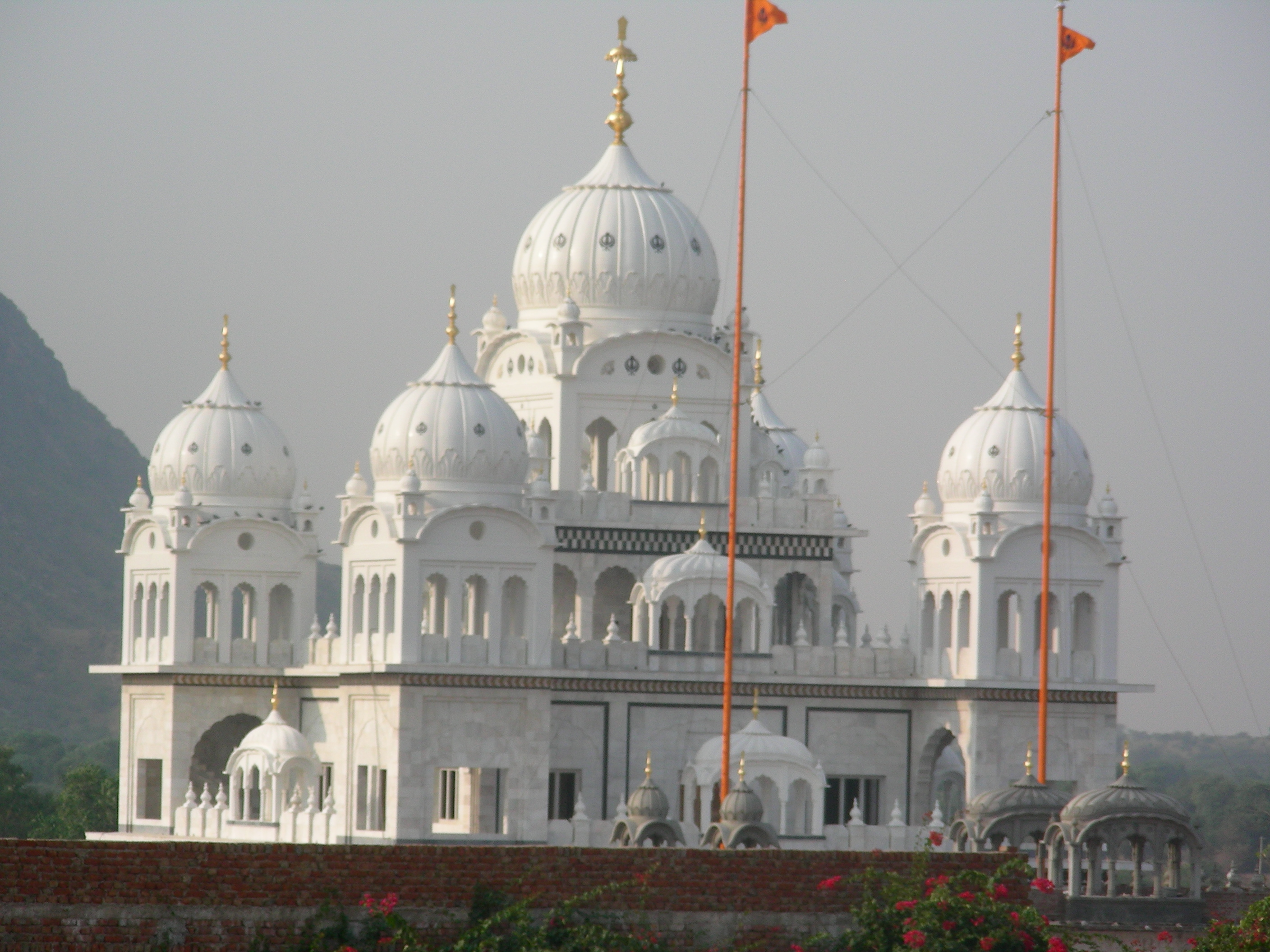
A Sikh Gurdwara in Pushkar

==== Pushkar Holi ====
Holi takes place in March and it is one of the most important festivals in the Hindu calendar. It represents the triumph of good over evil and the coming of springtime. Holi celebrations happen all over India and involve huge jubilant street parties. During Holi, Bhang (ancient Indian cannabis edible) is served in Pushkar, which is known to have some of the best Bhang in India.

=== Other landmarks ===
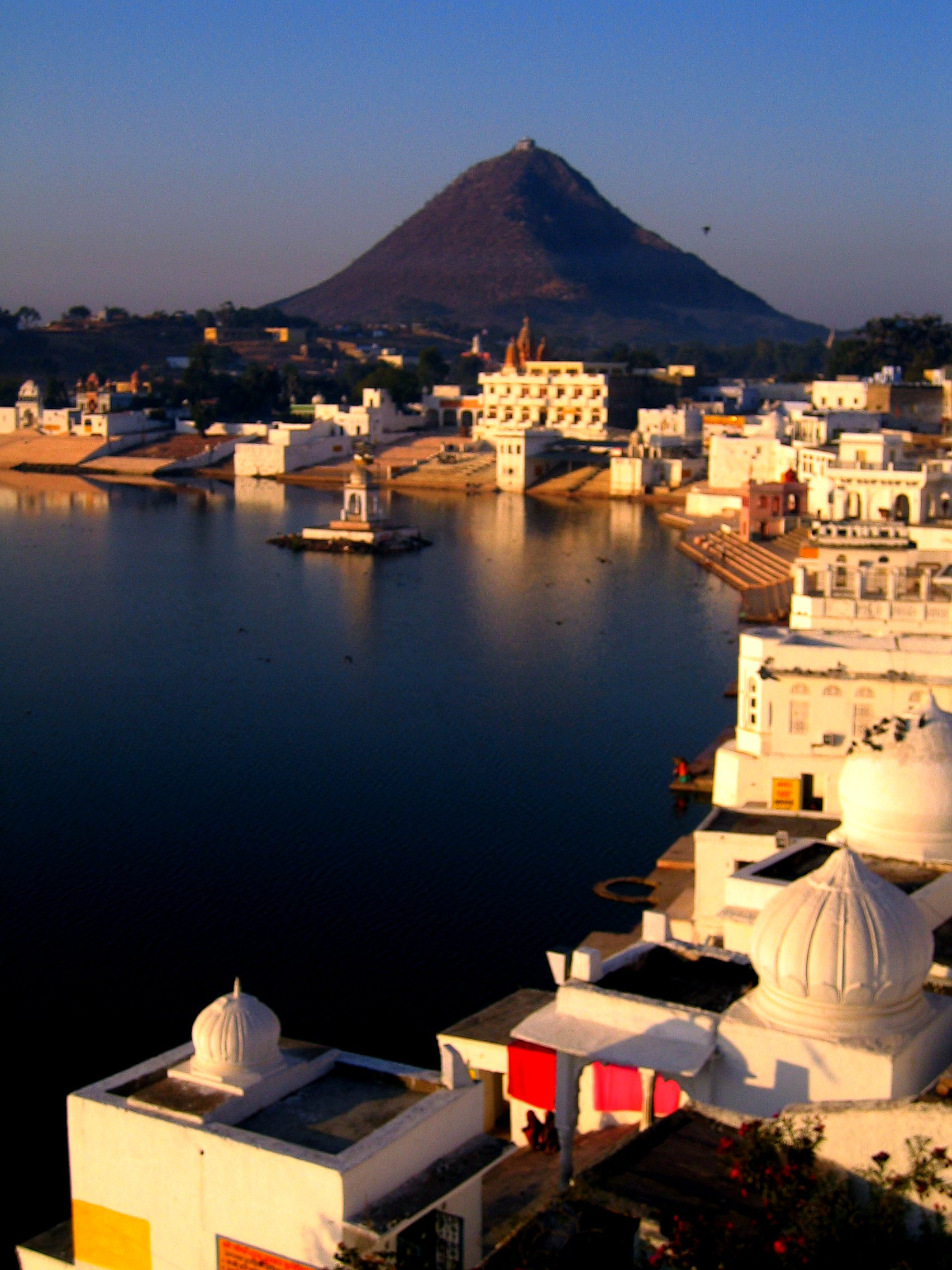
Ghats at Pushkar lake

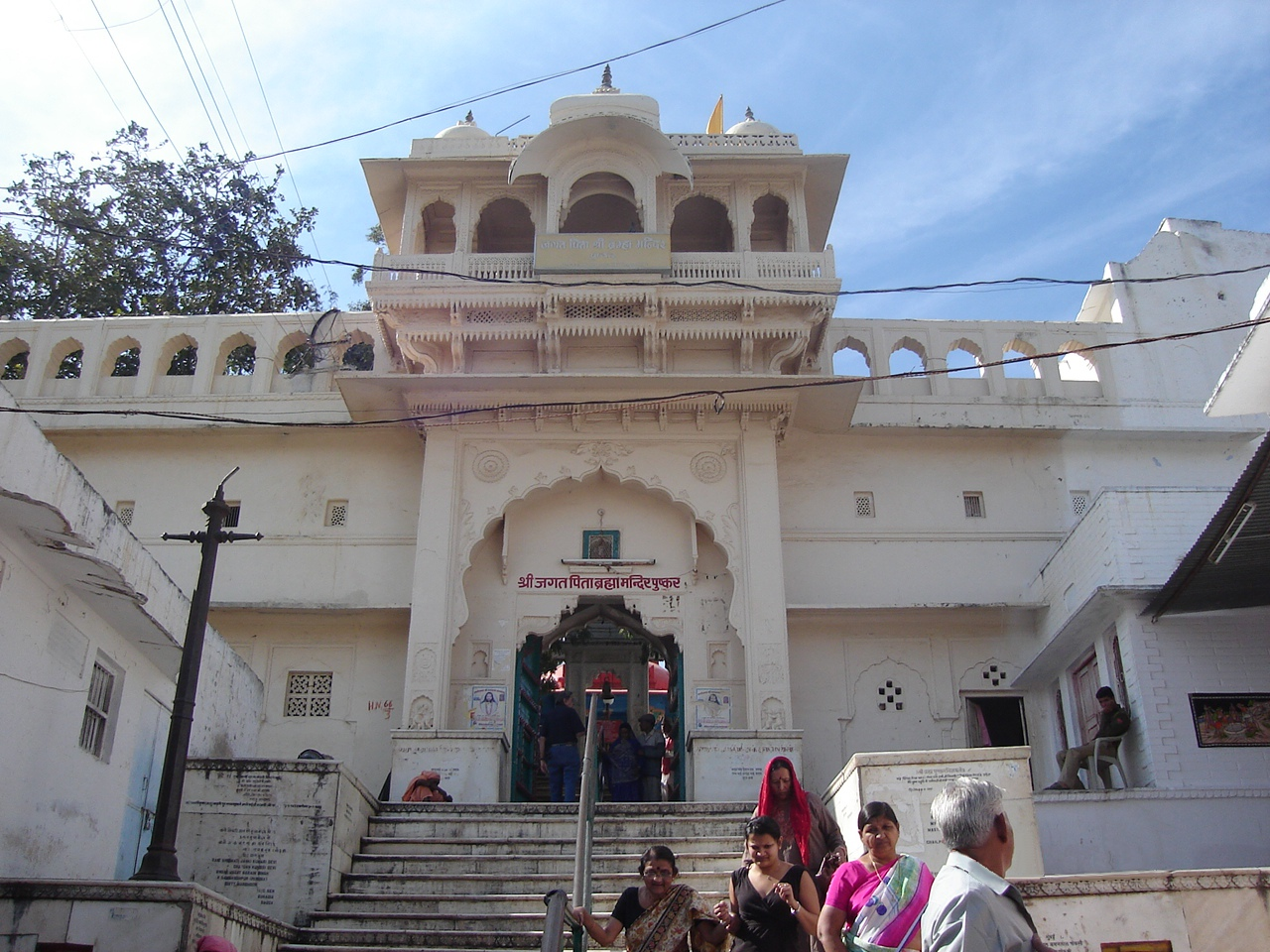
The Brahma temple at Pushkar

- Sikh Gurdwaras Pushkar is a sacred pilgrimage site for Sikhs as well, according to Gurmukh Singh, with Gurdwaras dedicated to Guru Nanak and Guru Gobind Singh. These have historic roots, with the Guru Nanak Gurdwara in the eastern part of the town called Guru Nanak Dharamsala, a name common for Sikh shrines before the 20th-century. The Sikh Dharamshala is a two-storeyed building consisting of a central room, surrounded by a verandah. The second Sikh temple is dedicated to Guru Gobind Singh marking his visit after he left Anandpur Sahib. Pandit Parmanand took an oath on the holy cow on behalf of Hindu kings and Muslim priest, Qazi Syyed Wali Hassan took an oath on the Quran which was handwritten by Aurangzeb. They promised that if Guru ji leaves Anandpur Sahib then he will not attack Guru ji and everyone can move out of Anandpur Sahib peacefully. The place he stayed in and the lakefront next to it is now called the Gobind Ghat. It has a memorial inscription and this shrine was built with the sponsorship of the Maratha Empire, after the widespread Hindu-Muslim wars in the final decades of Aurangzeb rule and the collapse of the Mughal Empire. The shrine has an old hand written copy of the Sikh scripture, the Guru Granth Sahib and a hukumnama believed by Sikhs to have been written by Guru Gobind Singh. Both these have been preserved by a Pushkar Brahmin priest, a descendant of the priest whom the Guru met. The hukumnama is on a bhoj patra, a method of recording letters in the 18th century.

Fairs

- Nagaur Fair
- Tejaji Fair

Ajmer is the nearest tourist attraction that lies outside the city boundaries of Pushkar. Located 27 kilometres away from Ajmer, there is Kishangarh, famous for its miniature paintings, more popularly known as Bani Thani.

- Ghats around lake

There are around 52 ghats around the lake. But some of the most visited ghats are Gwalior ghat, yag ghat, Varaha ghat, gau ghat, Jaipur ghat, karni ghat, dadhich ghat, saptarishi ghat, and Kota ghat. Authorities consider all these ghats around the lake as “monuments of national importance.”

The royal families of Rajasthan restored the lake and ghats.

== Culture ==
=== Cuisine ===
Because of its holy status and number of temples, Pushkar is a vegetarian city where the sale of meat, fish, eggs, and alcohol are all banned. Popular foods include malpuas, paranthas, and vegetarian thali.

== See also ==
- Brahma Temple
- Pushkar Lake
- Savitri Mata Mandir
- Pushkar Fair
- List of lakes in India
- Ajmer
- Suresh Singh Rawat member of the 14th House Representing Pushkar Constituency.
