= Tourism in Rajasthan =

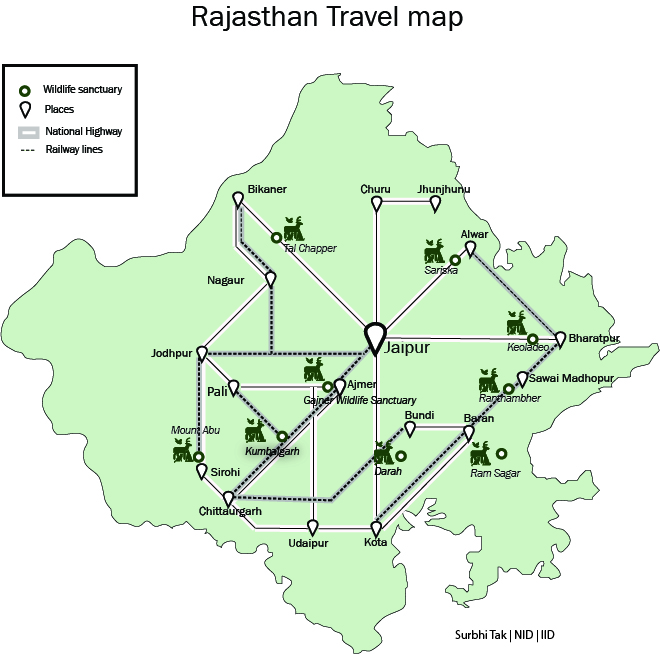
Schematic map of Rajasthan Travel map

Rajasthan is one of the most popular tourist destinations in India, for both domestic and international tourists. Rajasthan attracts tourists for its historical forts, palaces, art and culture with its slogan "Padharo Mhare Desh (Welcome to my land)". The capital city, Jaipur, also known as Pink City, is a very popular tourist destination and it is a part of the Golden Triangle. The Walled City of Jaipur is only the second Indian city to be recognized as a UNESCO World Heritage Site, after Ahmedabad.

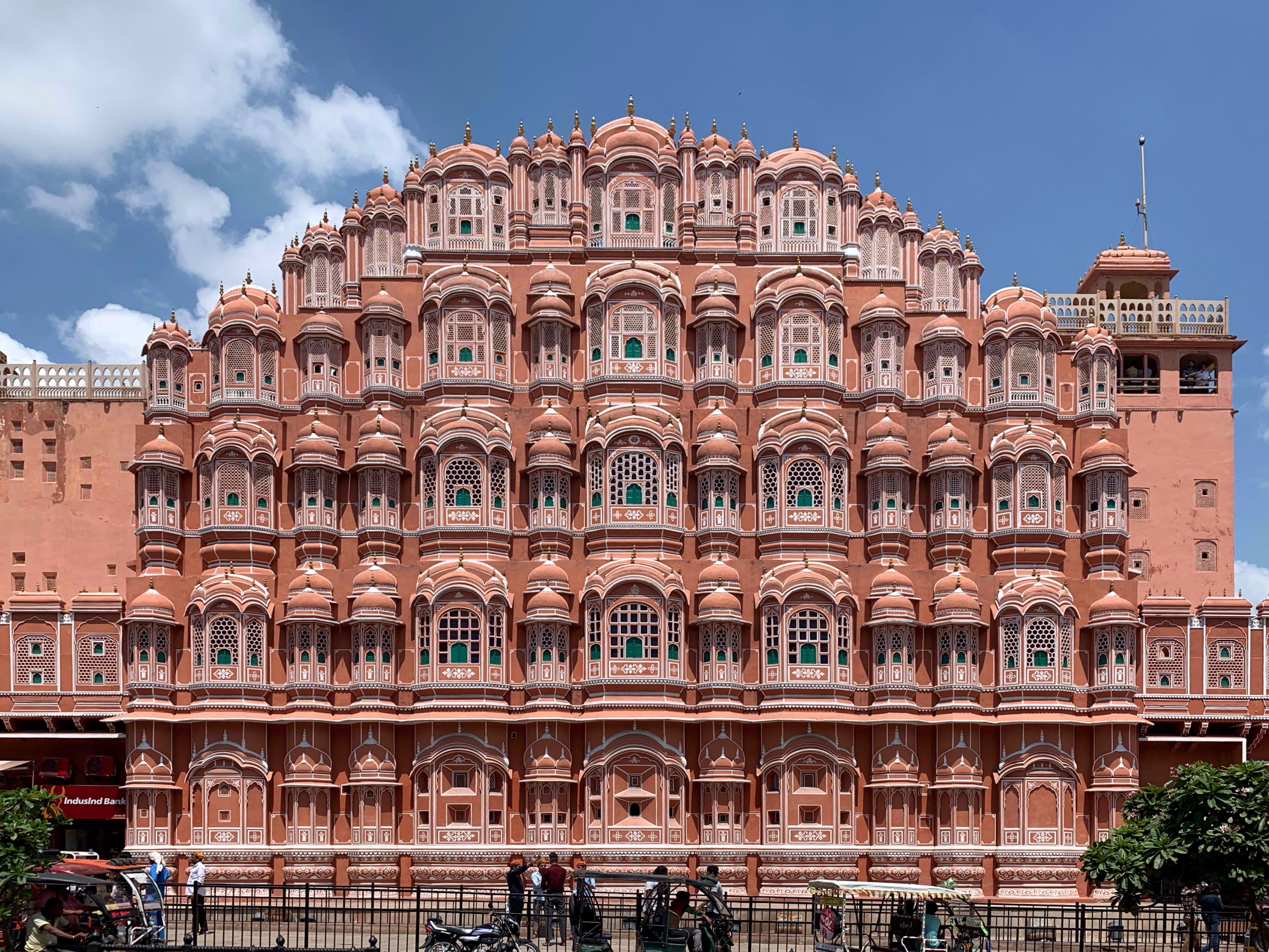
Jaipur, also known as Pink City, is the capital of Rajasthan and a UNESCO World heritage site

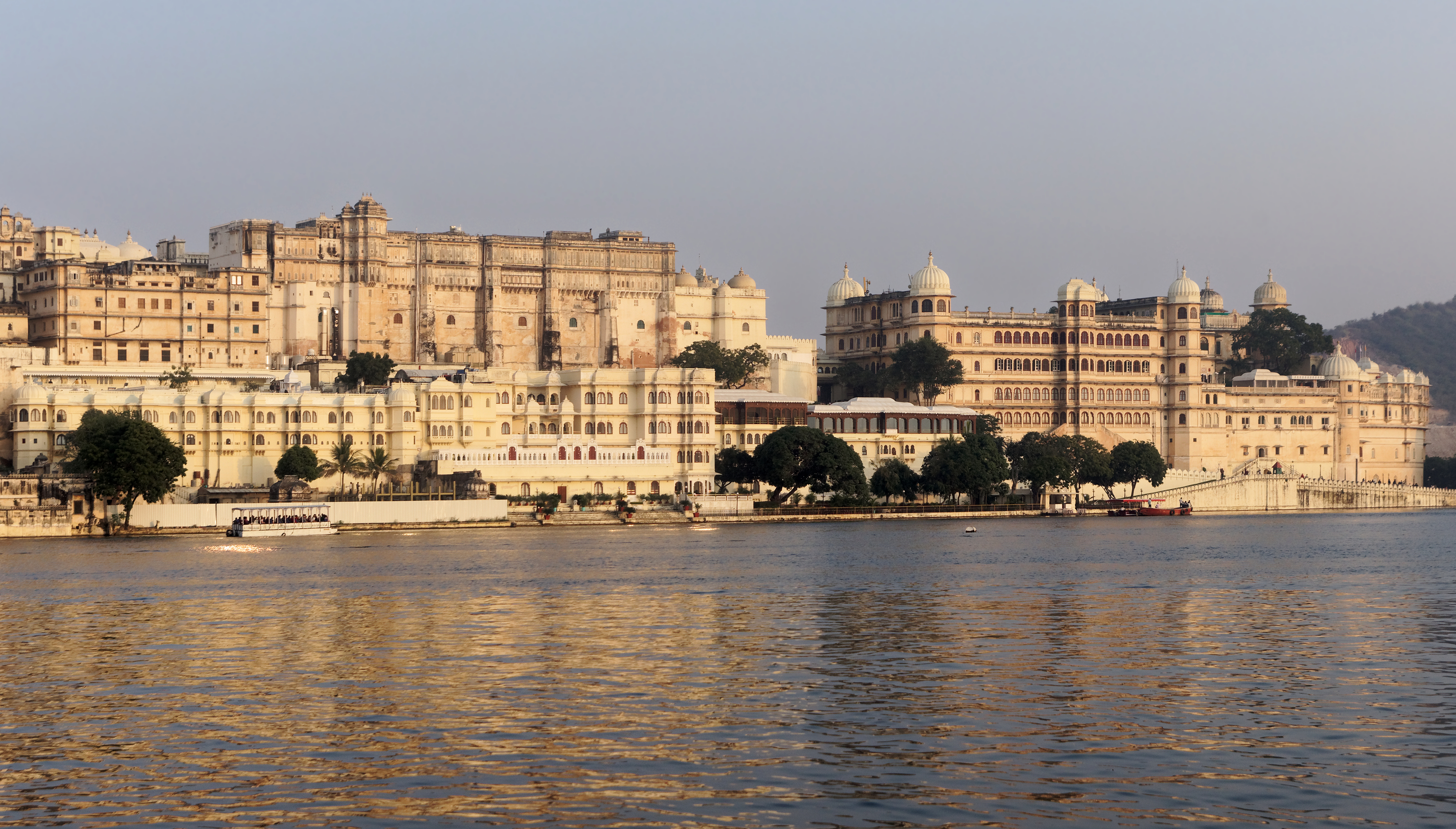
Udaipur City Palace

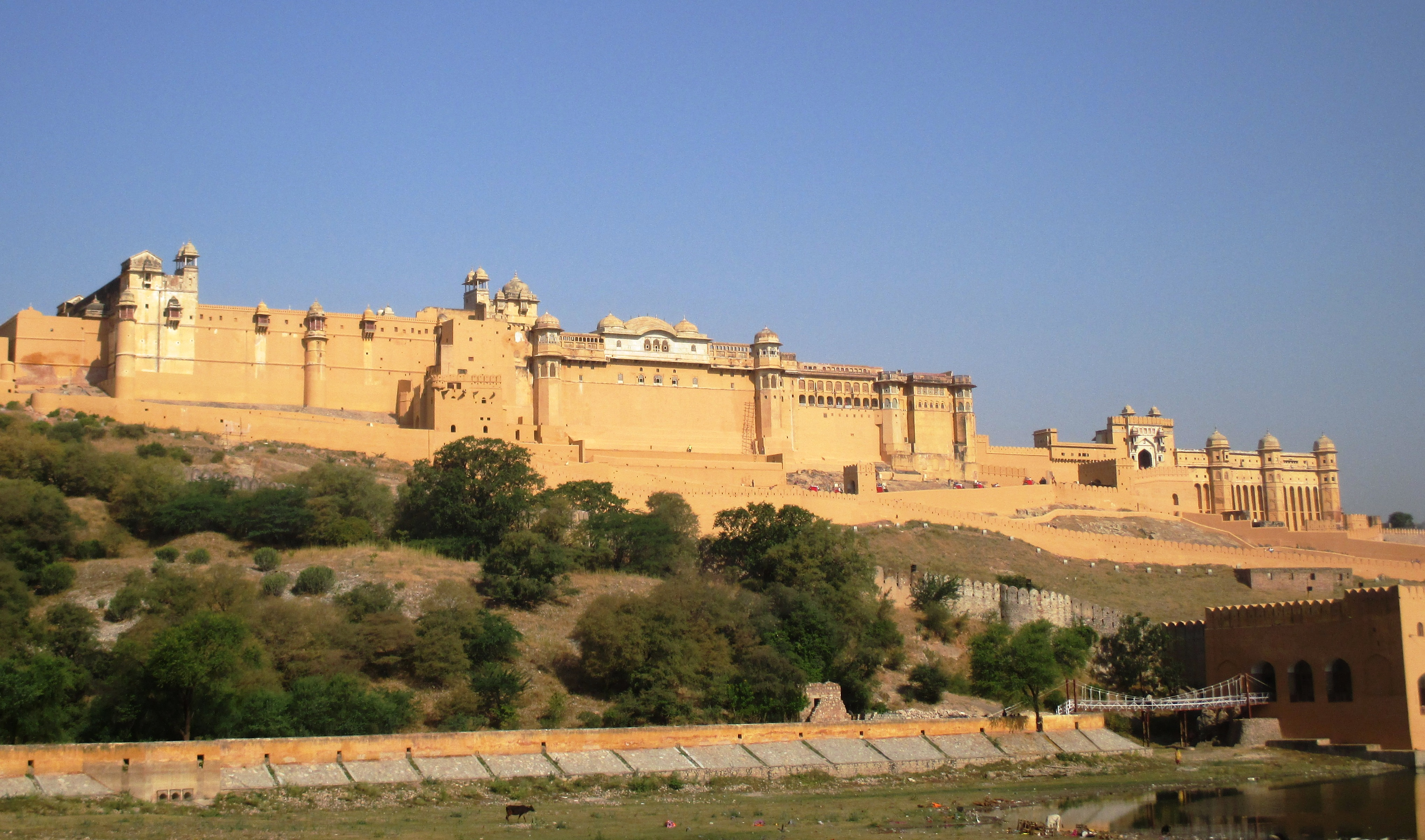
Amber Fort, a UNESCO World heritage site

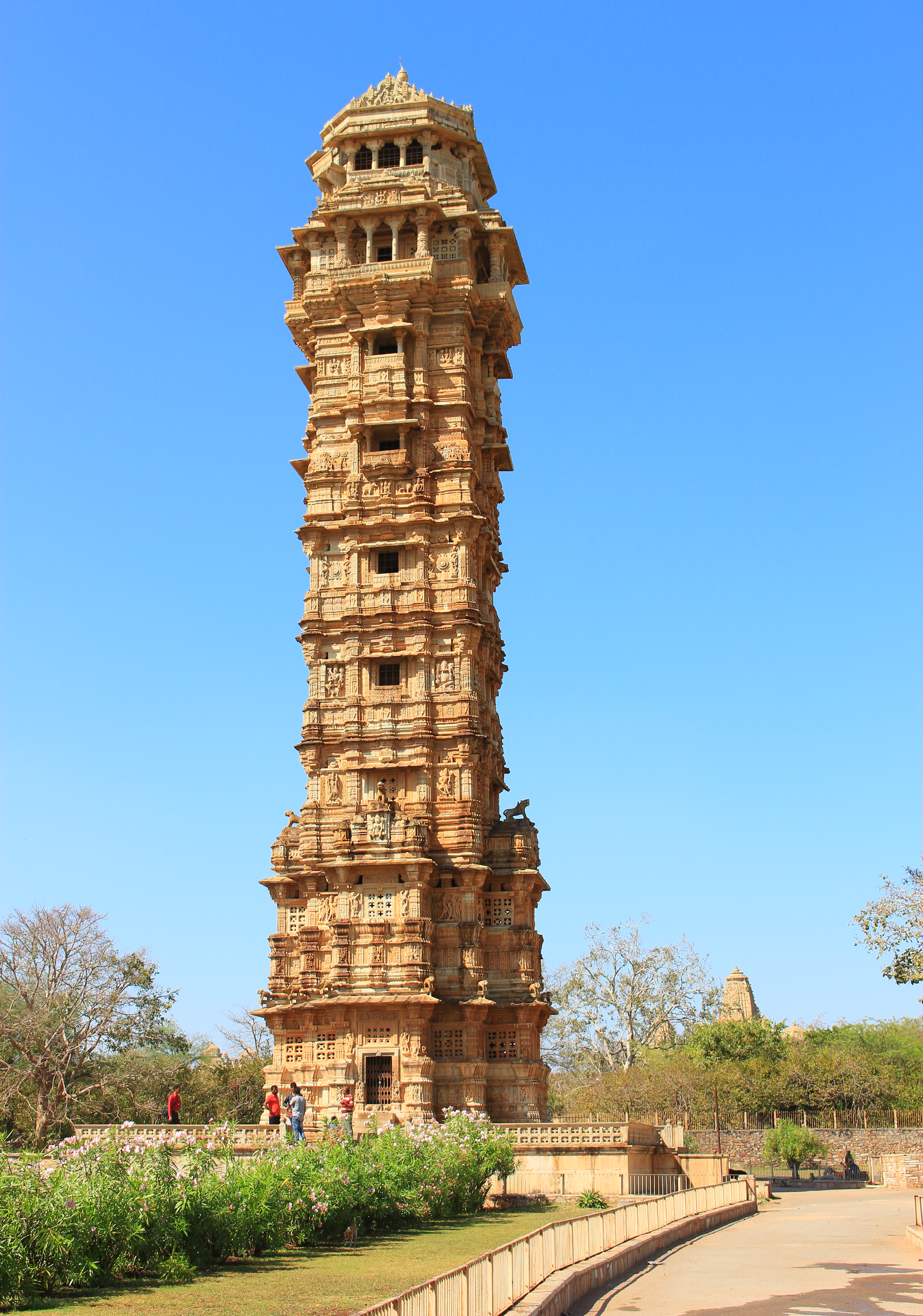
Vijaya Stambha

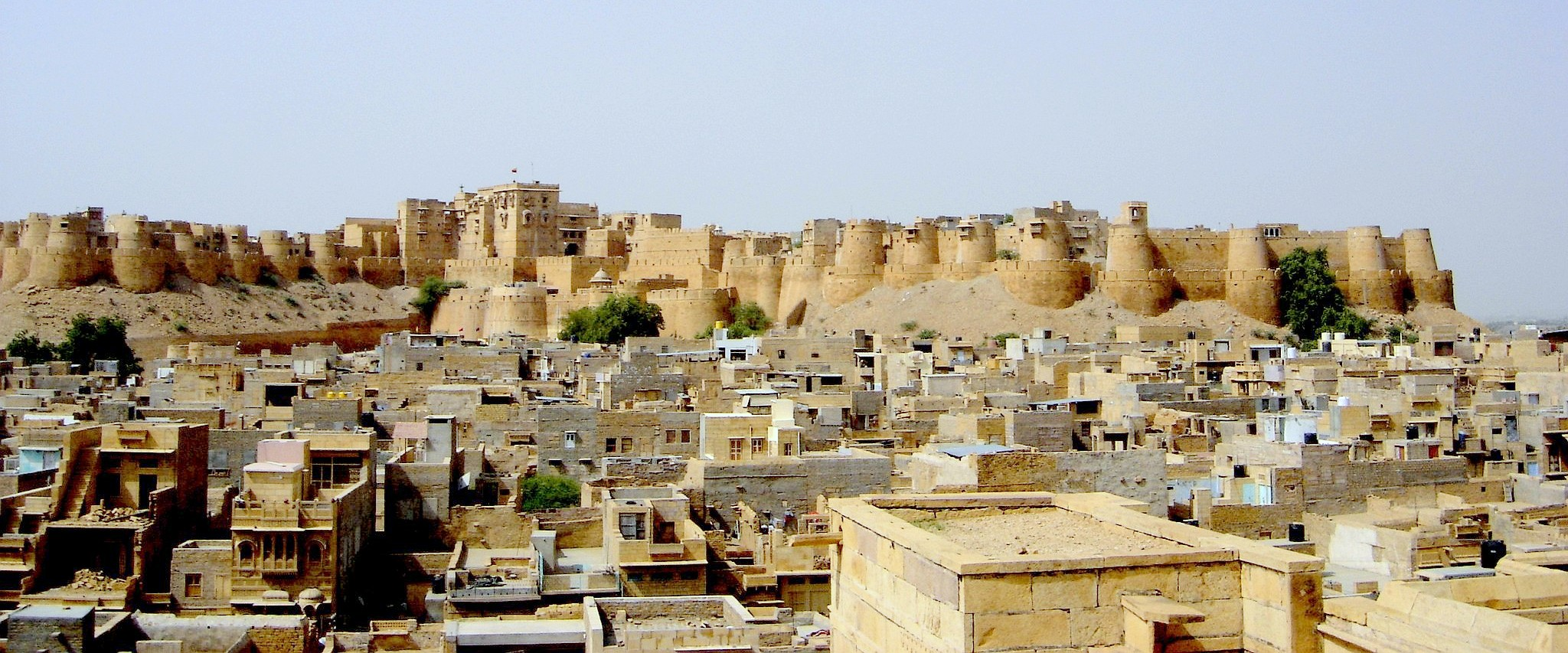
Jaisalmer Fort, a UNESCO World heritage site

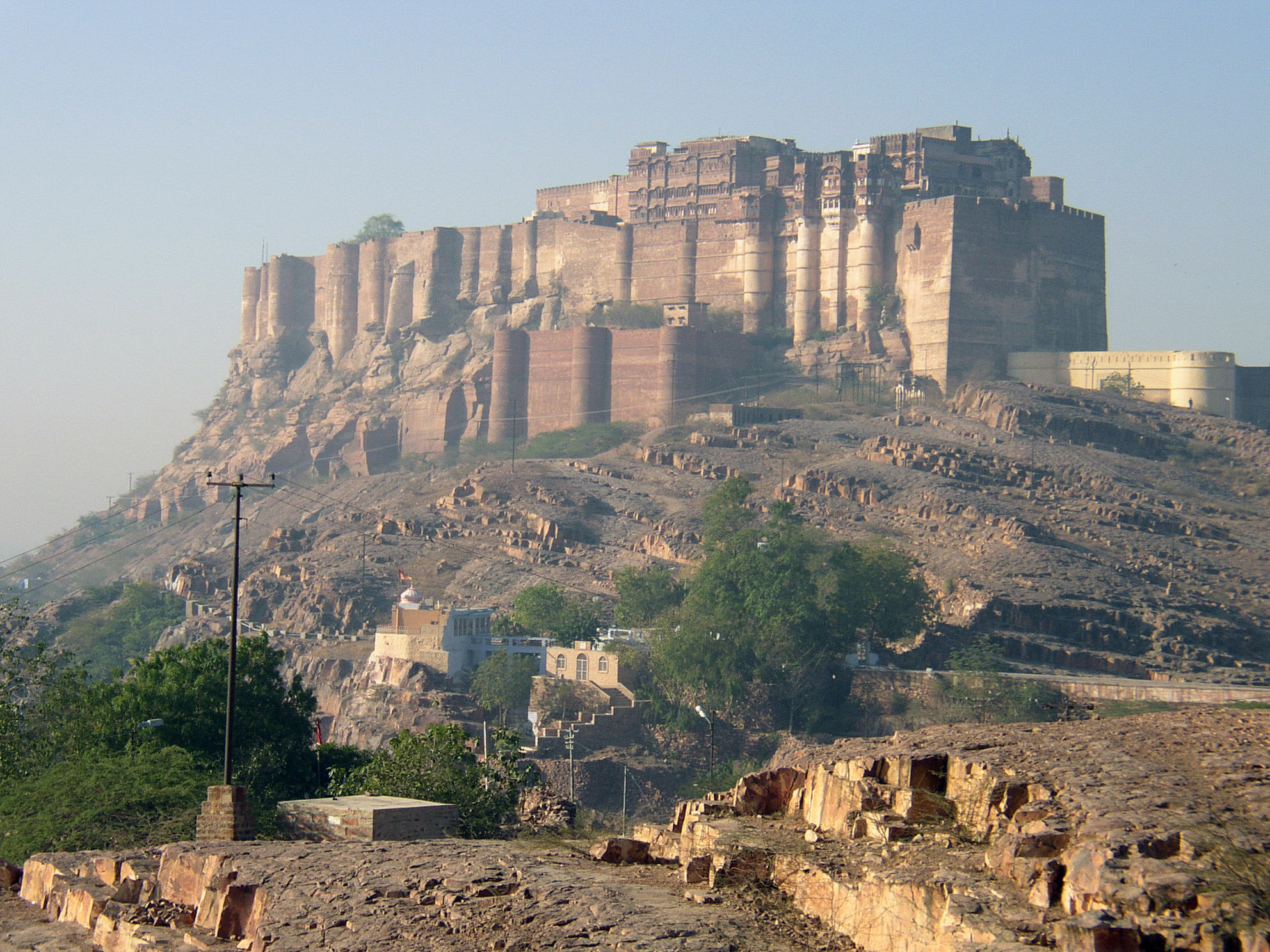
Mehrangarh Fort

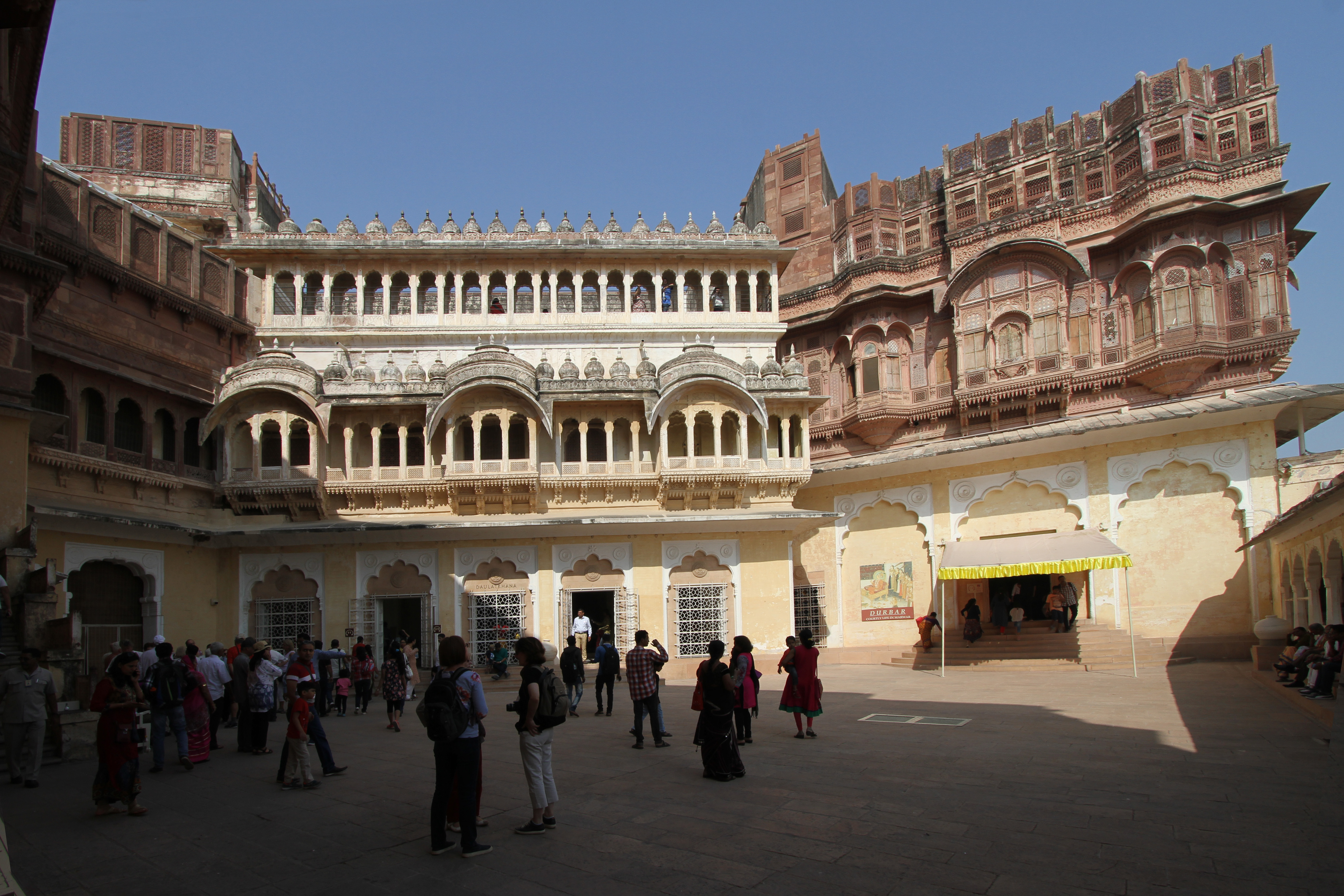
Inside view of Mehrangarh Fort

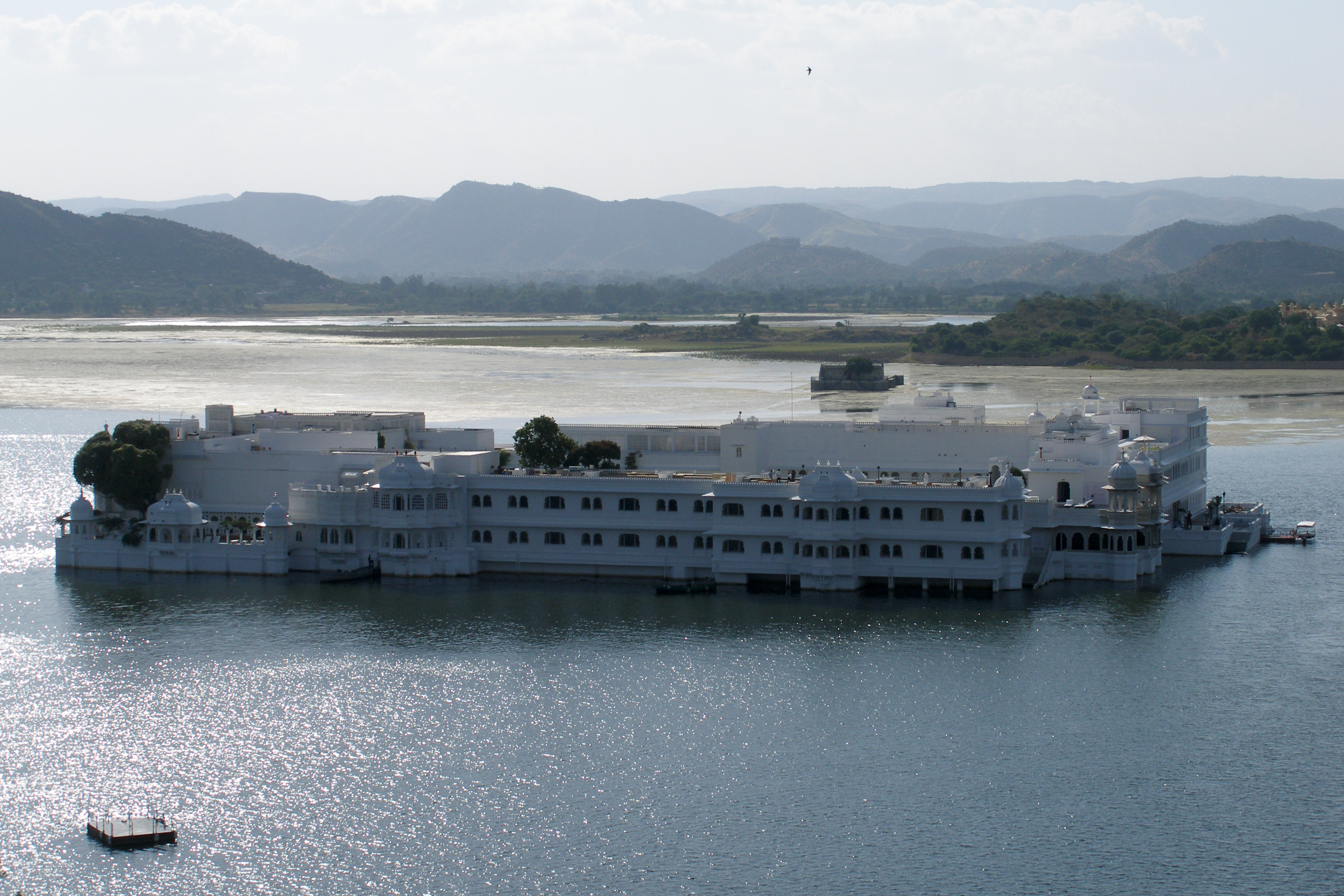
Udaipur Lake Palace

The palaces of Jaipur, lakes of Udaipur, and desert forts of Jodhpur, Bikaner, and Jaisalmer are among the most preferred destinations of many tourists, Indian and foreign. Tourism accounts for almost 15% of the state's domestic product. In 2019, 52 million domestic tourists visited Rajasthan.

== Palaces ==
Rajasthan is known for its historical hill forts & palaces, it is claimed as the best place for tourism-related to palaces.

- Umaid Bhawan Palace: It is the largest Royal Palace in Rajasthan. It is also one of the largest private residences in the world.
- Lake Palace: It is now a luxury hotel located in Pichola Lake, Udaipur.
- Hawa Mahal: It is also known as "Palace of Wind" or "Palace of Breeze" because there are more than 953 Windows in the Palace.
- Rambagh Palace: Formerly a Royal Palace now converted into a Heritage Hotel.
- Devi Garh Palace: Formerly a palace now converted into a Heritage Hotel, In 2006, The New York Times named it as one of the leading luxurious hotels in the Indian subcontinent.
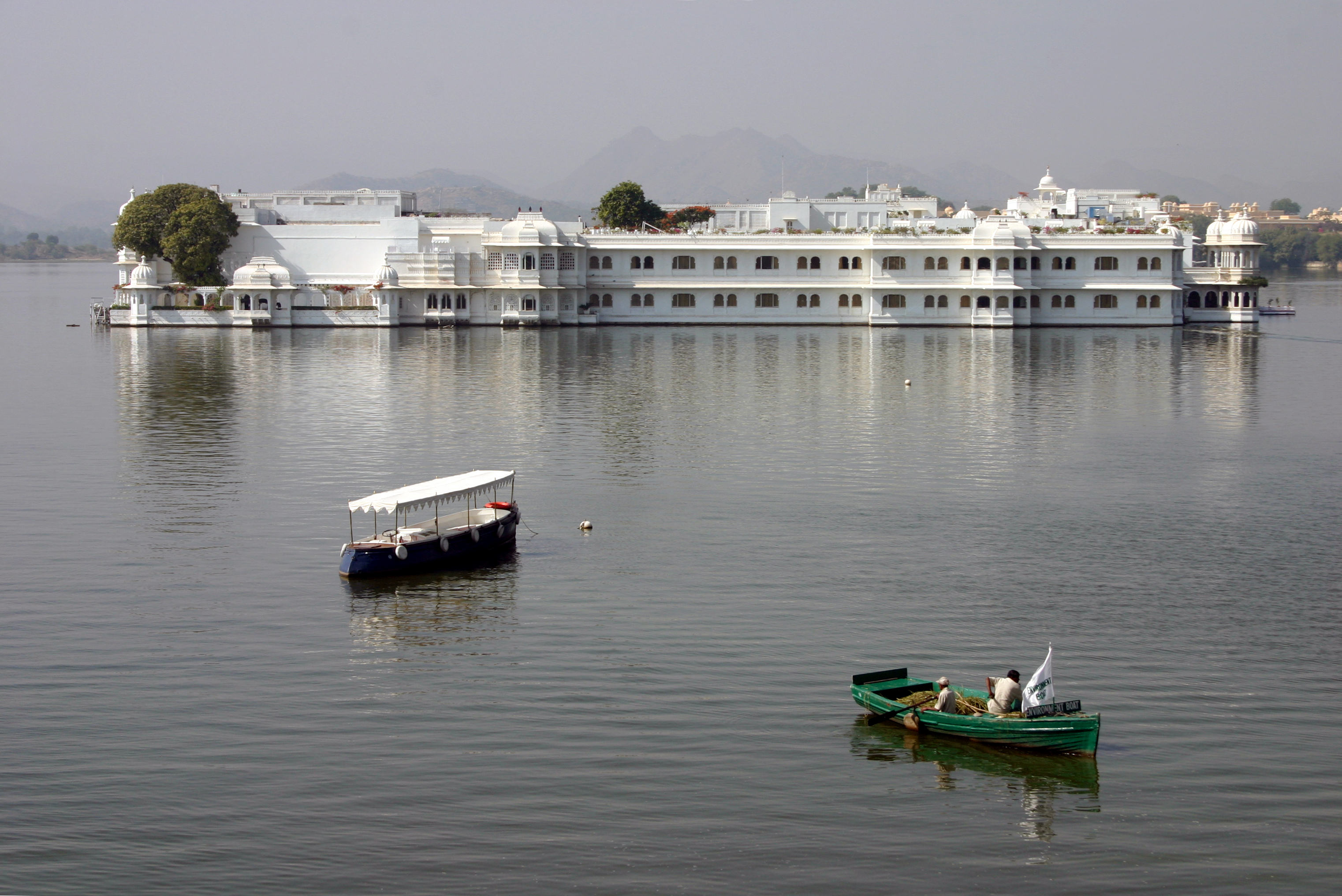
Lake Palace

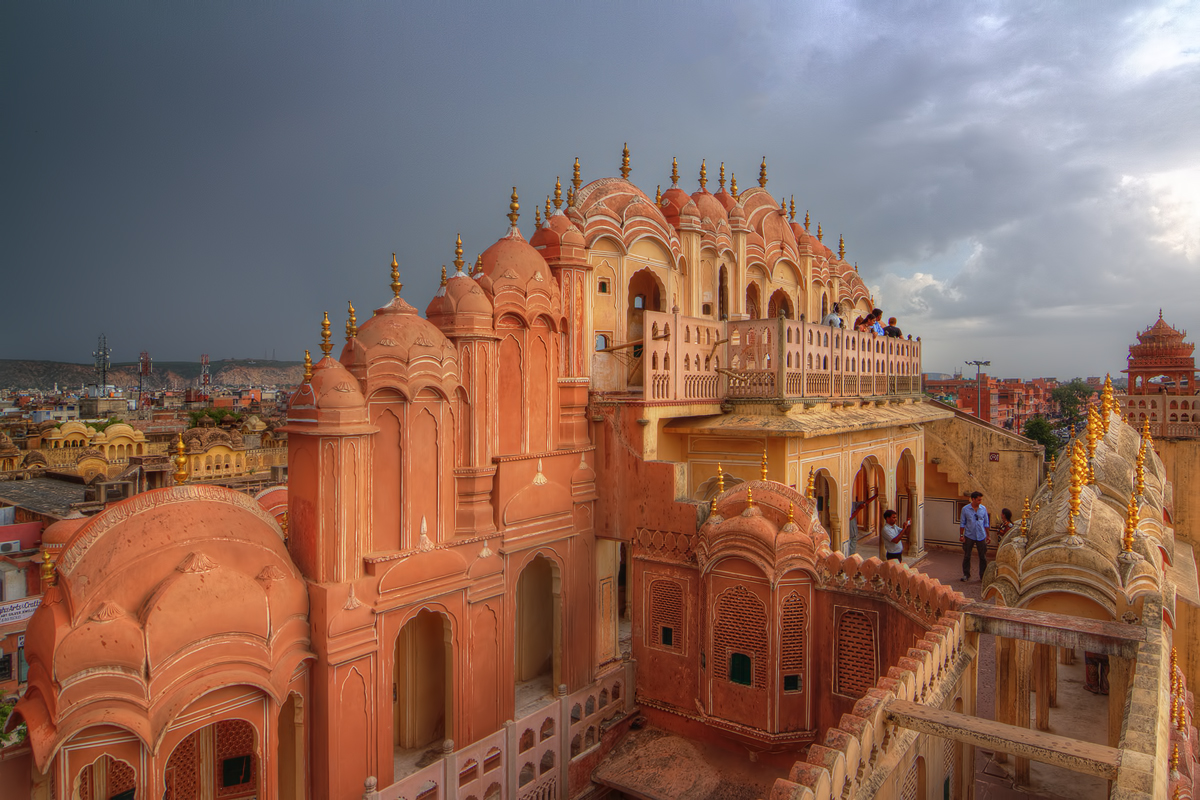
Hawa Mahal

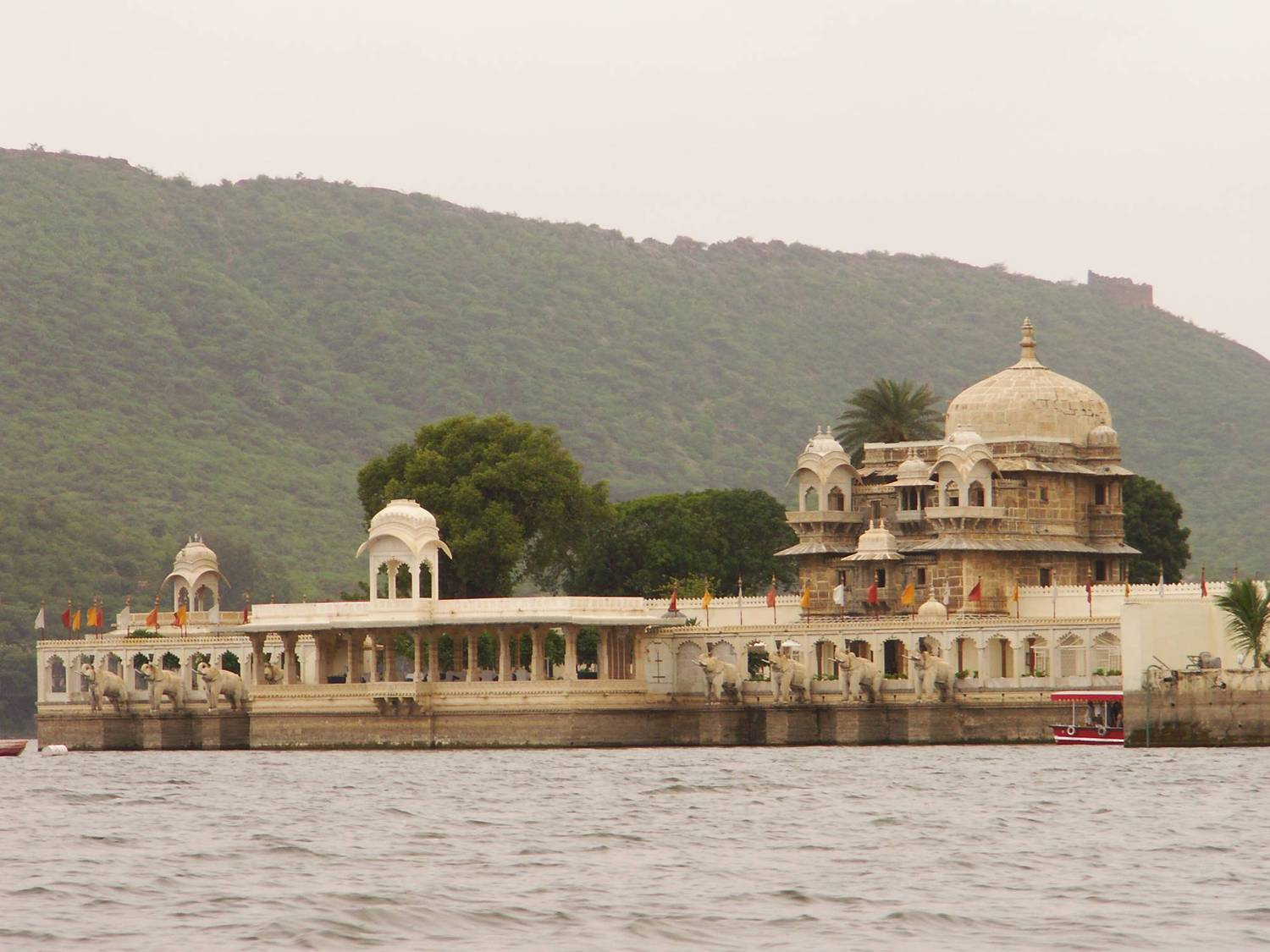
Jag Mandir

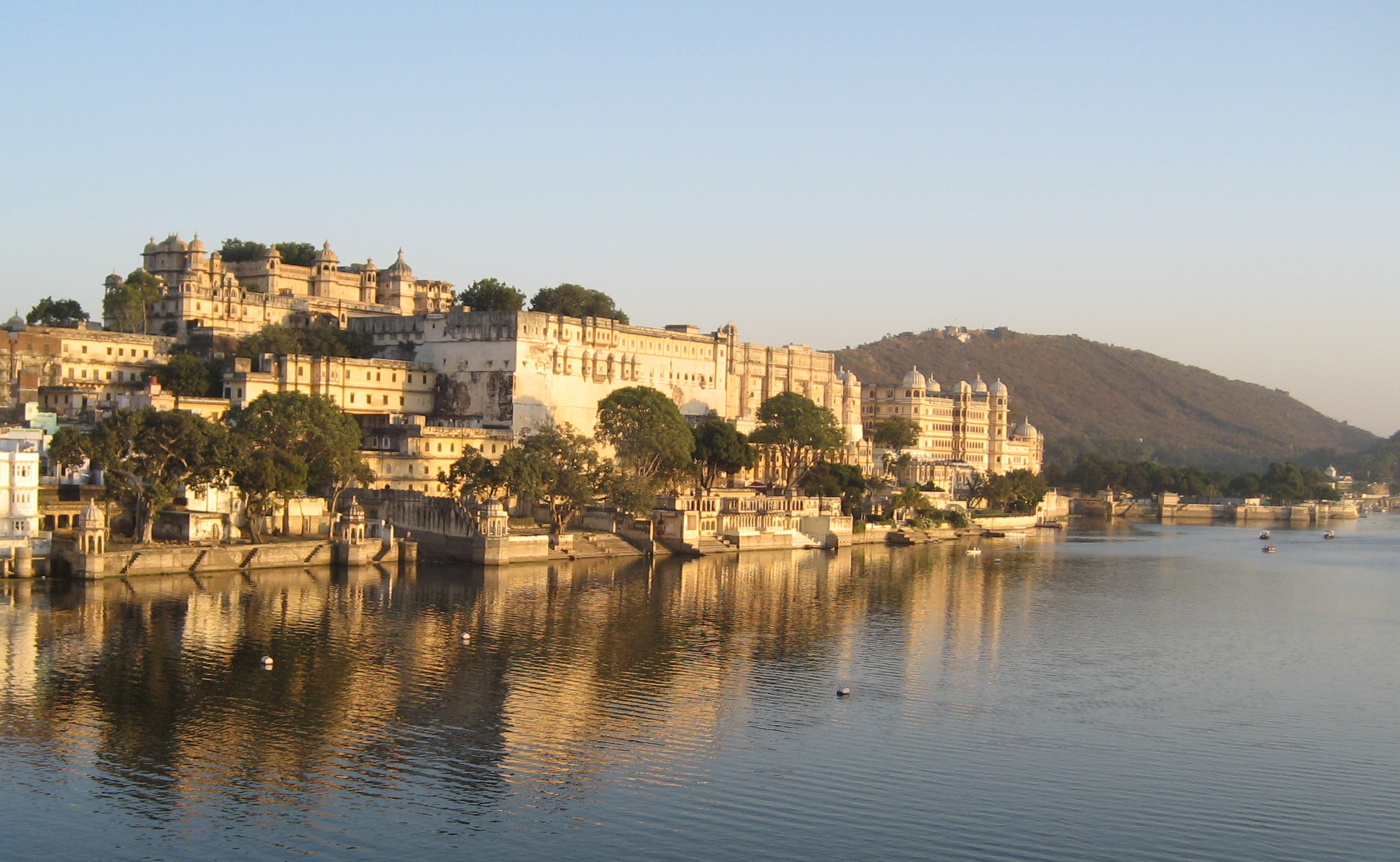
City Palace, Udaipur

== Forts ==
Rajasthan is known for its forts. Hill Forts of Palaces in Rajasthan are also a part of world heritage.

=== Hill forts in the World Heritage list ===
The six Hill Forts of Rajasthan, spread across Rajasthan state in northern India, clustered together as a designated UNESCO World Heritage Site. The forts are mainly based in the Aravalli Range, and were built and enhanced between the 5th and 18th centuries CE by several Rajput kings of different kingdoms. They comprise:

1. Chittor Fort at Chittorgarh
2. Kumbhalgarh Fort at Kumbhalgarh
3. Ranthambore Fort at Sawai Madhopur
4. Gagron Fort at Jhalawar
5. Amer Fort at Jaipur
6. Jaisalmer Fort at Jaisalmer
7. Khejarla Fort at Khejarla, Jodhpur

Some of these forts have defensive fortified walls of up to 20 km long, still surviving urban centers and still in use for water harvesting mechanism.

=== Other forts ===
These are some of the prominent forts of Rajasthan:

- Bhangarh Fort
- Mehrangarh Fort
- Nahargarh Fort
- Jhilai Fort (Chota Amer
- Shivad Fort
- Barwada Fort
- Bhatner fort
- Junagarh Fort
- Lohagarh Fort
- Laxmangarh Fort
- Jaigarh Fort
- Jamwa Ramgahd Fort
- Gagron Fort
- Bhainsrorgarh Fort
- Taragarh Fort
- Jalore Fort
- Alwar Fort
- Achalgarh Fort
- Nagaur Fort
- Shergrah Fort
- Laxmangarh Fort
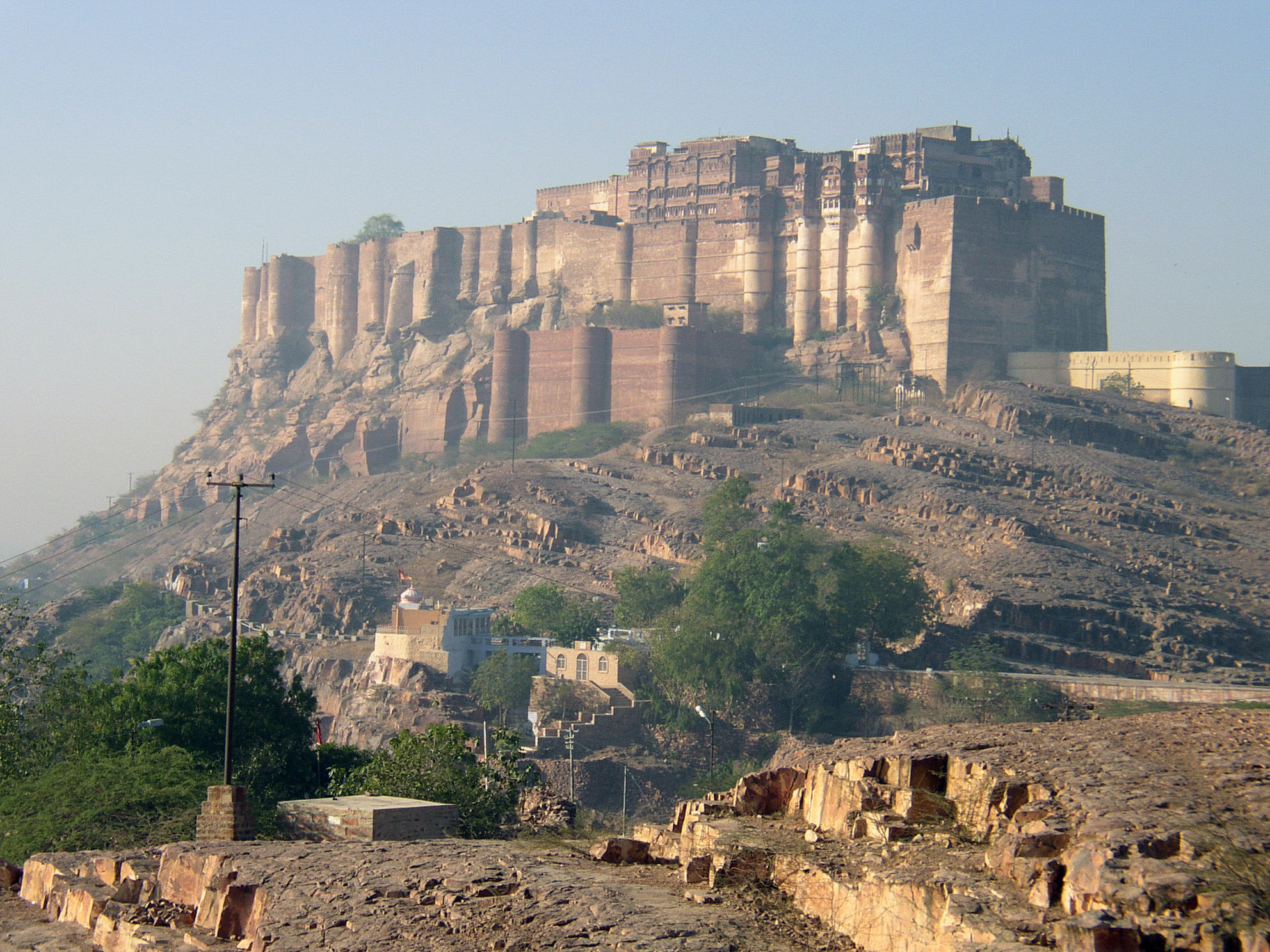
Mehrangarh Fort

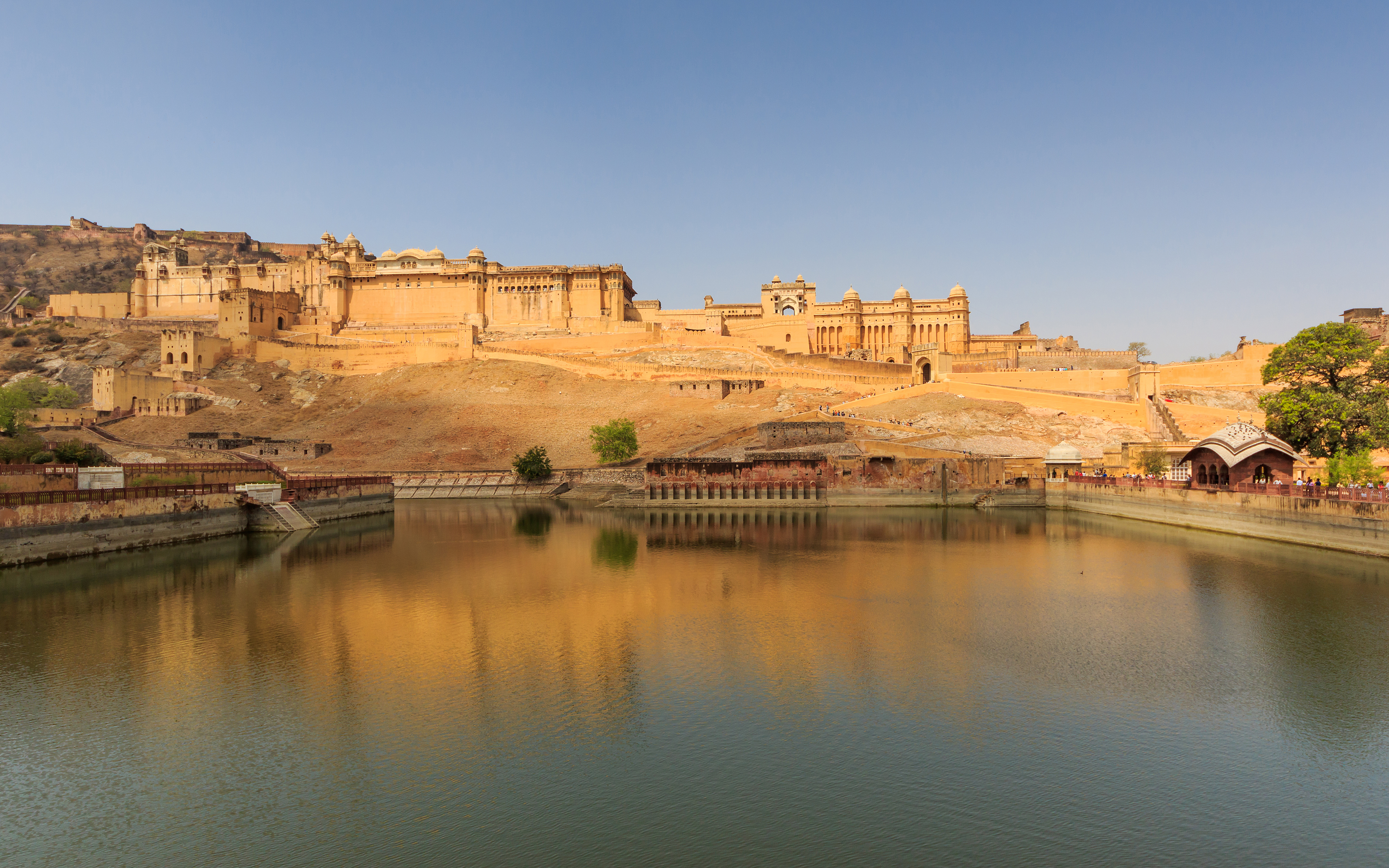
Amber Fort

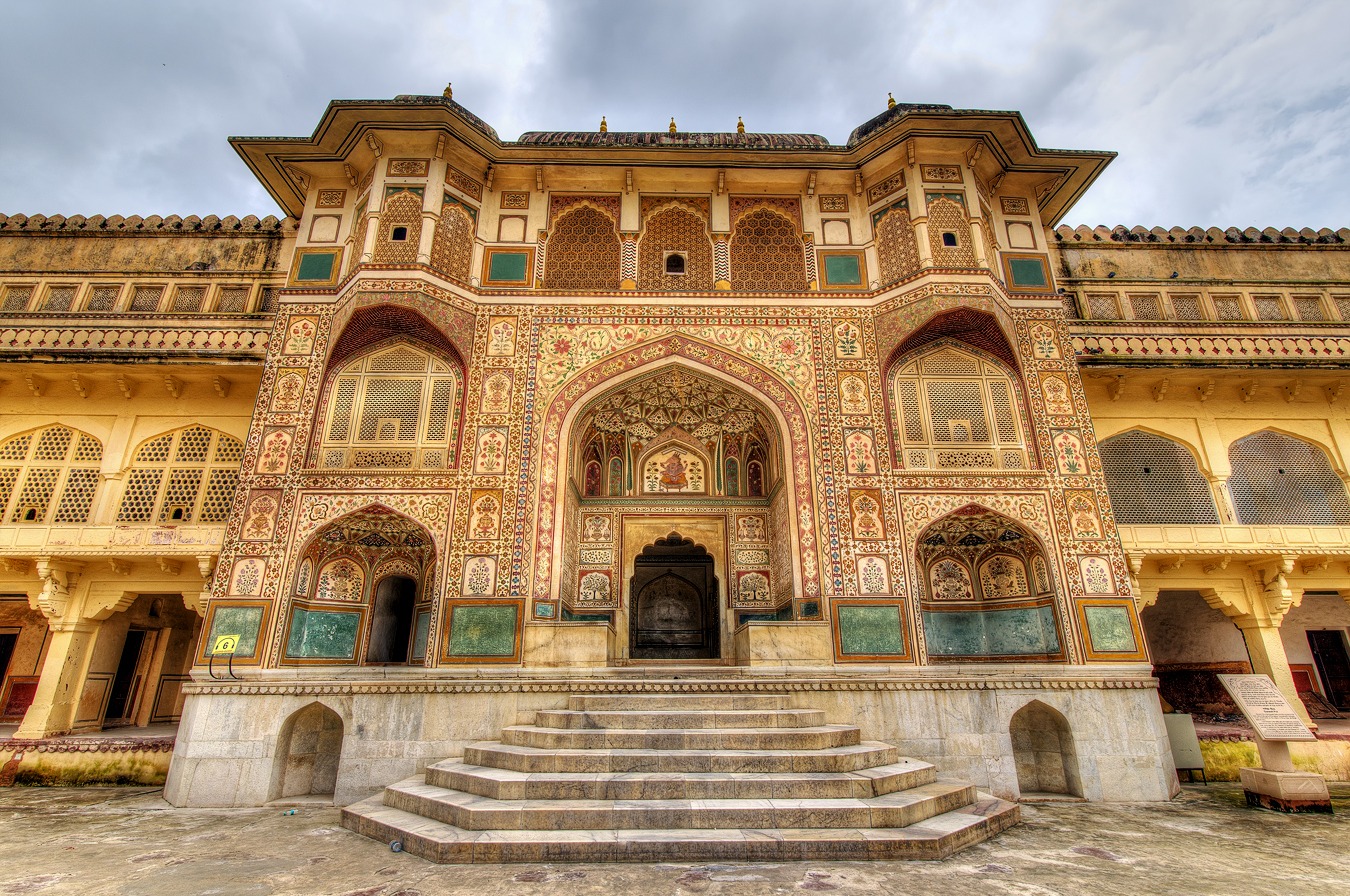
Ganesh Pol Entrance, Amer Fort

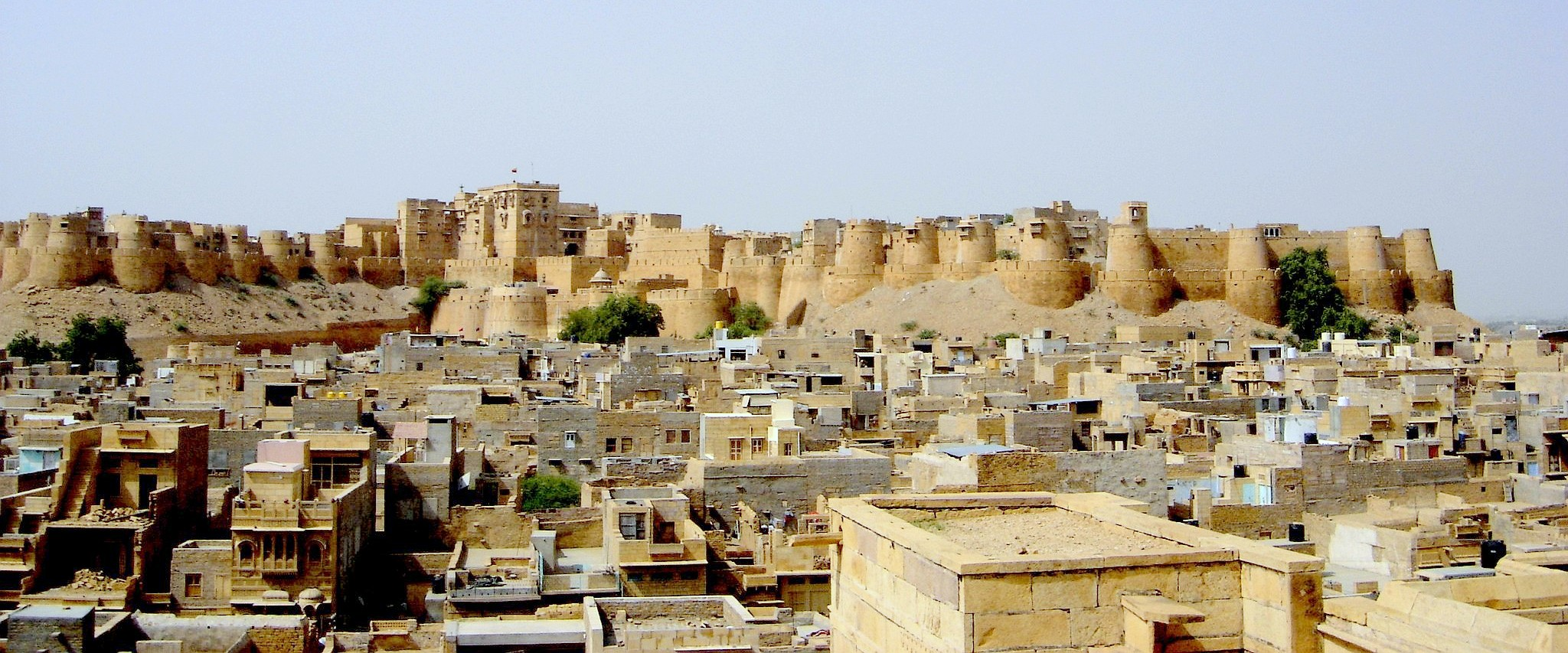
Jaisalmer Fort

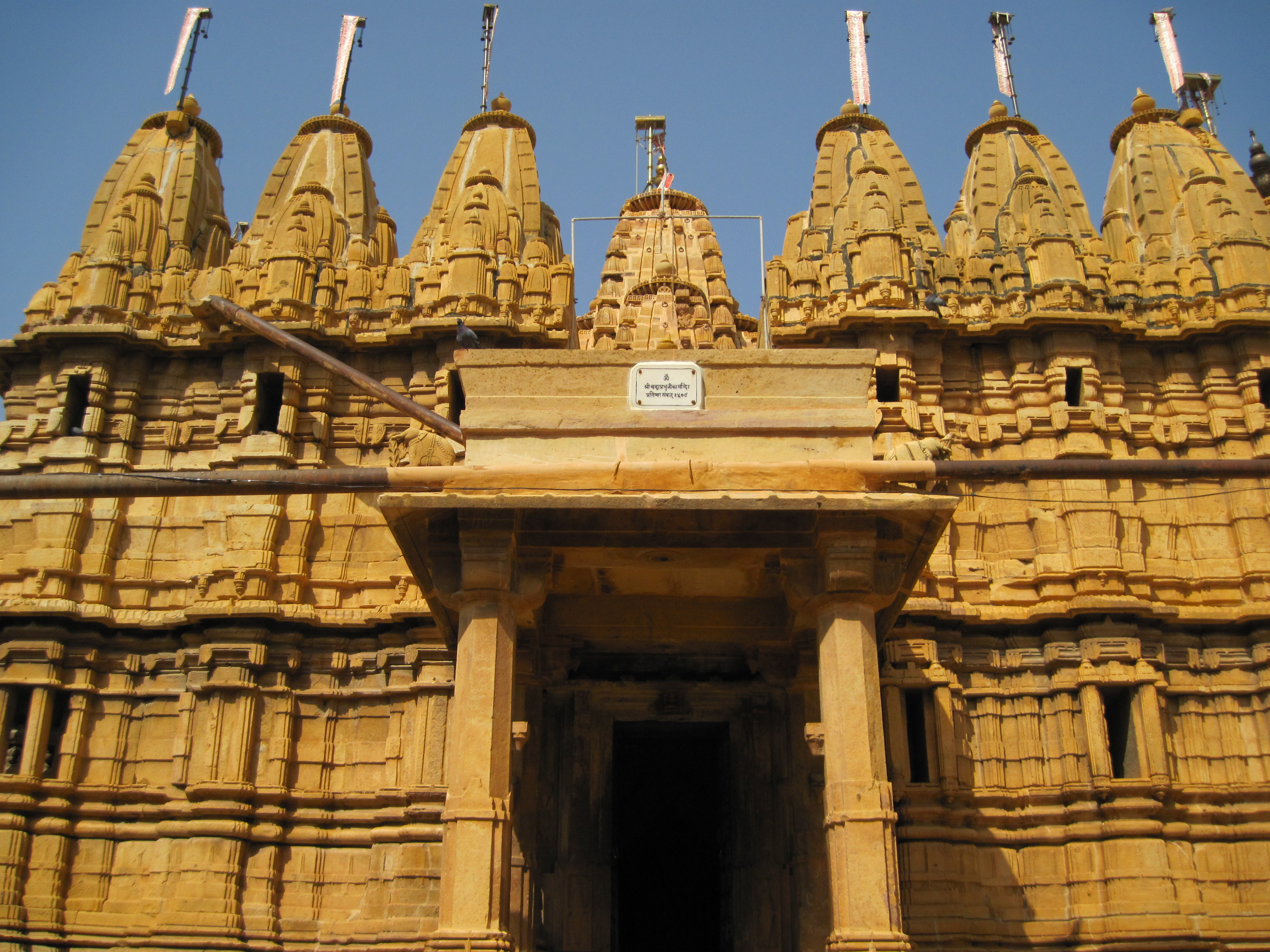
Jain Temple inside Jaisalmer Fort

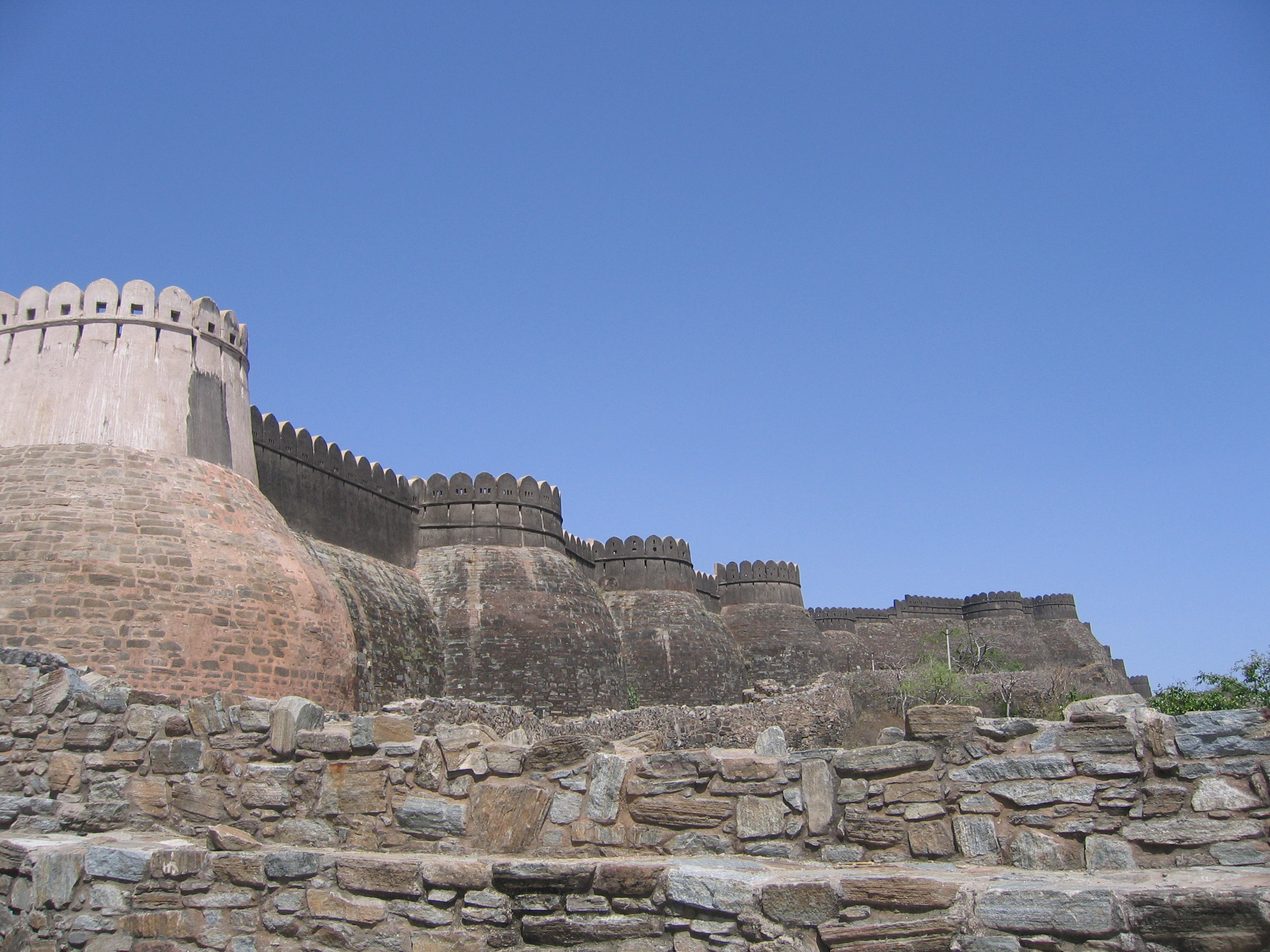
Kumbhalgarh Fort

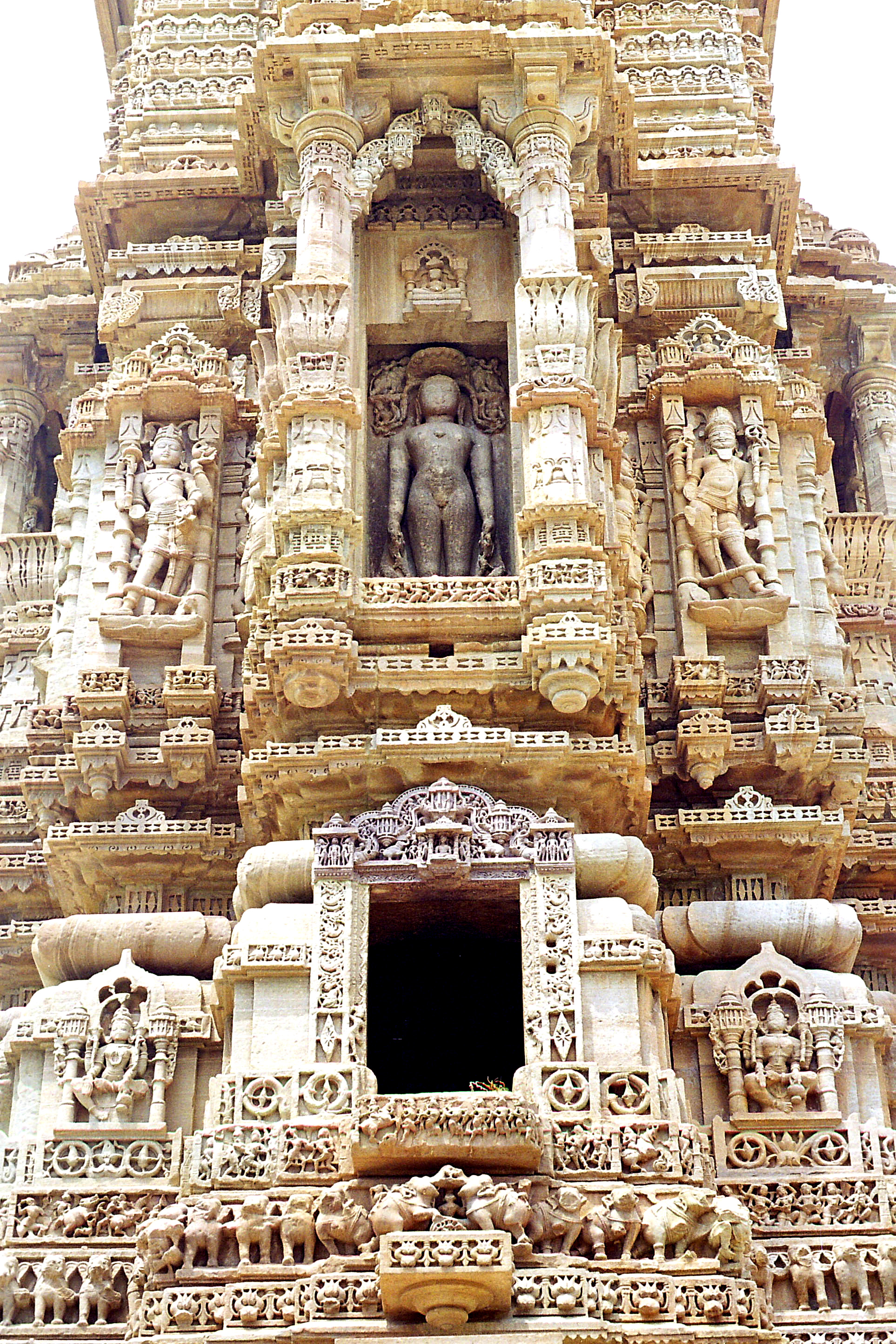
Carving of Kirti Stambh, Chittor Fort

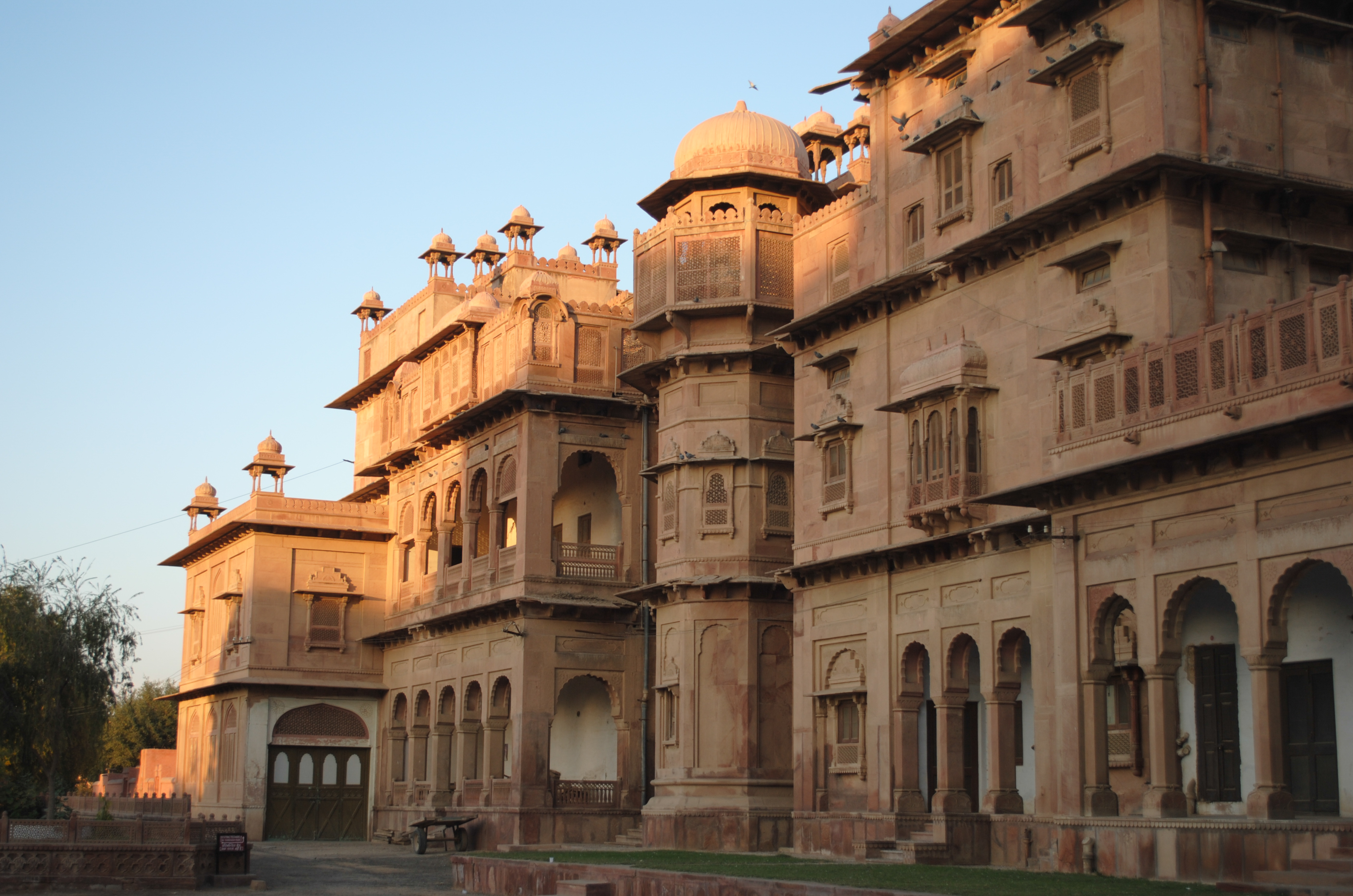
Junagarh Fort

== Fairs and Festivals ==
Department of Tourism of Rajasthan Government organizes multiple fairs & festivals during the year. These festivals & fairs are great tourist attractions. Fairs organized in Rajasthan include:

- Camel Festival, Bikaner (January)
- Nagaur Fair, Nagaur (Jan-Feb.)
- Kite Festival (held on 14 January of every year)
- Desert Festival, Jaisalmer (Jan-Feb.)
- Baneshwar Fair, Baneshwar (Jan-Feb.)
- Gangaur Festival, Jaipur (March–April)
- Mewar Festival, Udaipur (March–April)
- Elephant Festival, Jaipur (March–April)
- Urs Ajmer Sharif, Ajmer (According to Lunar Calendar)
- Summer Festival, Mt. Abu (June)
- Teej Festival, Jaipur
- Kajli Teej, Bundi (July–August)
- Dussehra Festival, Kota (October)
- Marwar Festival, Jodhpur (October)
- Pushkar Fair, Ajmer (November)
- Dhundad fair, Jaipur

(November)

== Wildlife Sanctuaries and National Parks ==
Rajasthan has many wildlife and bird sanctuaries. Amongst them are Keoladeo Ghana Bird Sanctuary, Ranthambore National Park, Mukundara Hills National Park, Sawai Madhopur Wildlife Sanctuary, Sariska Tiger Reserve, and Desert National Park. Ramgarh, and the Jawai Bandh Leopard Conservation Reserve.

== Religious Sites ==
Rajasthan has many famous temples from medieval times. Some temples are Ghushmeshwar Temple, Eklingji Temple, Shrinathji Temple, Trinetra Ganesh Temple, Ranthambore, Mehandipur Balaji, Govind Dev Ji, Radha Gopinath Ji, Galtaji, Salasar Balaji, Khatu Shyam Temple, Karni Mata Temple, Ranakpur Jain temple, Rani Sati Temple, Osian temple, Brahma Temple, Pushkar and Dilwara Temples. Along with temples, there are important Sufi shrines too, most famous among them is Dargah (Tomb) of Khwaja Moinuddin Chishti. Tarkeshwar Nath

== Popular tourist attractions ==
- Ajmer - Popular for Ajmer Sharif Dargah and Soniji Ki Nasiyan Jain Temple.
- Barmer - Barmer and surrounding areas offer a perfect picture of typical Rajasthani villages.
- Bhilwara - Popular for its textile industry. Hamirgarh Eco-park and Harni Mahadev temple are important tourist destinations.
- Bikaner - Famous for its havelis, palaces and the Karni Mata Temple in Deshnoke.
- Chittorgarh - Popular for its monument and fort.
- Bundi - Popular for its forts, palaces and stepwell reservoirs known as baoris.
- Dausa - It is popular for Chand Baori and Mehandipur Balaji Temple.
- Jaipur - city palace home of Royal family Also known as Pink City of India and the capital of Rajasthan Amer fort and Jaigarh fort world largest cannon situated in famous tourist spot such as Nahargarh fort, Jantar Mantar, Hawa Mahal, and Jal Mahal and Rani Shisodiya Ka Bhag, Galta Ji temple also known as Monkey temple. Famous temple—Govind devji Maharaj, Kuldevi of Kachwaha (Jamway Mata ji), kala hanuman ji, khola ka hanuman ji, Tadkeshwar Mahadev, kuldevta of kachwaha (Ambikeshwar Mahadev), Jagat shiromani temple, chauth Mata ji temple (Barwara), Shila Mata temple.
- Jaisalmer - Famous for its golden fortress, havelis and some of the oldest Jain temples and libraries.
- Jawai Region, often described as "India's Masai Mara", is an emerging wildlife tourism destination in Rajasthan, centred around the Jawai Bandh Leopard Conservation Reserve, and is noted for its dramatic granite landscapes and the unique coexistence of leopards with local communities.
- Jhalawar district - Caves like Binnayaga Buddhist Caves, Hathiagor Buddhist Caves, Kolvi Caves are popular medieval architecture of India.
- Jhunjhunu district - Famous for Khetri Mahal, Rani Sati Temple, Alsisar Mahal, Badalgarh Fort, Tibrewala and Modi Haveli, Bissau Fort, Surajgarh Fort, Shyamgarh Fort, Bishangarh Fort, Mandawa Fort, Havelis in Nawalgarh, Fort of Mukundgarh.
- Jodhpur - Famous for its architecture, blue homes give the name "Blue City" and Mehrangarh fort.
- Kota - Well known for its gardens, palaces, and Chambal river safari.
- Mount Abu - A hill station with 11th century Dilwara Jain Temples. The highest peak in the Aravalli Range of Rajasthan, Guru Shikhar is just 15 km from the main town. Mount Abu is also a good attraction place for adventure lover . There are many kinds of adventure activities like trekking, caving, Rock climbing, Rappelling etc.
- Nathdwara - This town near Udaipur hosts the temple of Shrinathji.
- Neemrana - home to the Neemrana Fort.
- Pushkar - It has the first and one of the very few Brahma temples in the world, and also his wife Savitri Devi's temple, built on a hilltop. The Pushkar lake is considered sacred for Hindus.
- Ranakpur - Large complex Jain Temple with about 1444 pillars and exquisite marble carvings.
- Ranthambore - Situated near Sawai Madhopur. This town has historic Ranthambore Fort and one of the largest national park of India (Ranthambore National Park).
- Sariska Tiger Reserve - Situated in the Alwar district.
- Shekhawati - Located are small towns such as Mandawa and Ramgarh with frescoed havelis between 100 years to 300 years old, and Vedic period Dhosi Hill.
- Udaipur - Also known as the "Venice of India".
- Mandawa -The town of Mandawa was a thikana of Jaipur State. Mandawa once functioned as a trading outpost for ancient caravan routes in Shekhawati for goods from China and the Middle East. Thakur Nawal Singh, then ruler of Nawalgarh and Mandawa built a fort in to protect this outpost. Over time, a township grew around the fort and soon attracted a large community of traders, who then settled down at Mandawa. The great Ghazal Singer of South Asia, Mehdi Hassan was born here and migrated to Pakistan after the partition of India.
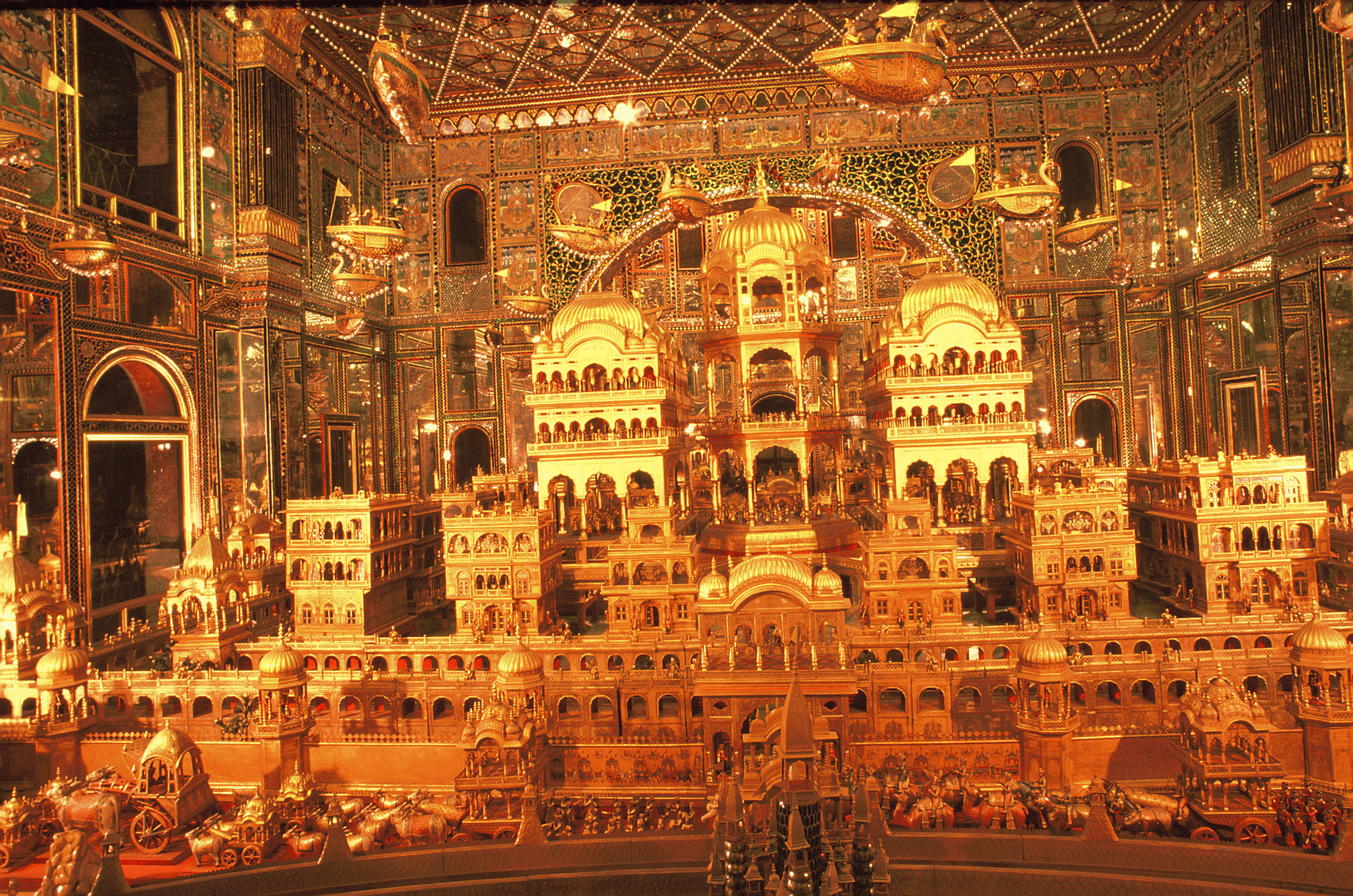
Gold carving depiction of legendary Ayodhya at the Ajmer Jain temple, Ajmer

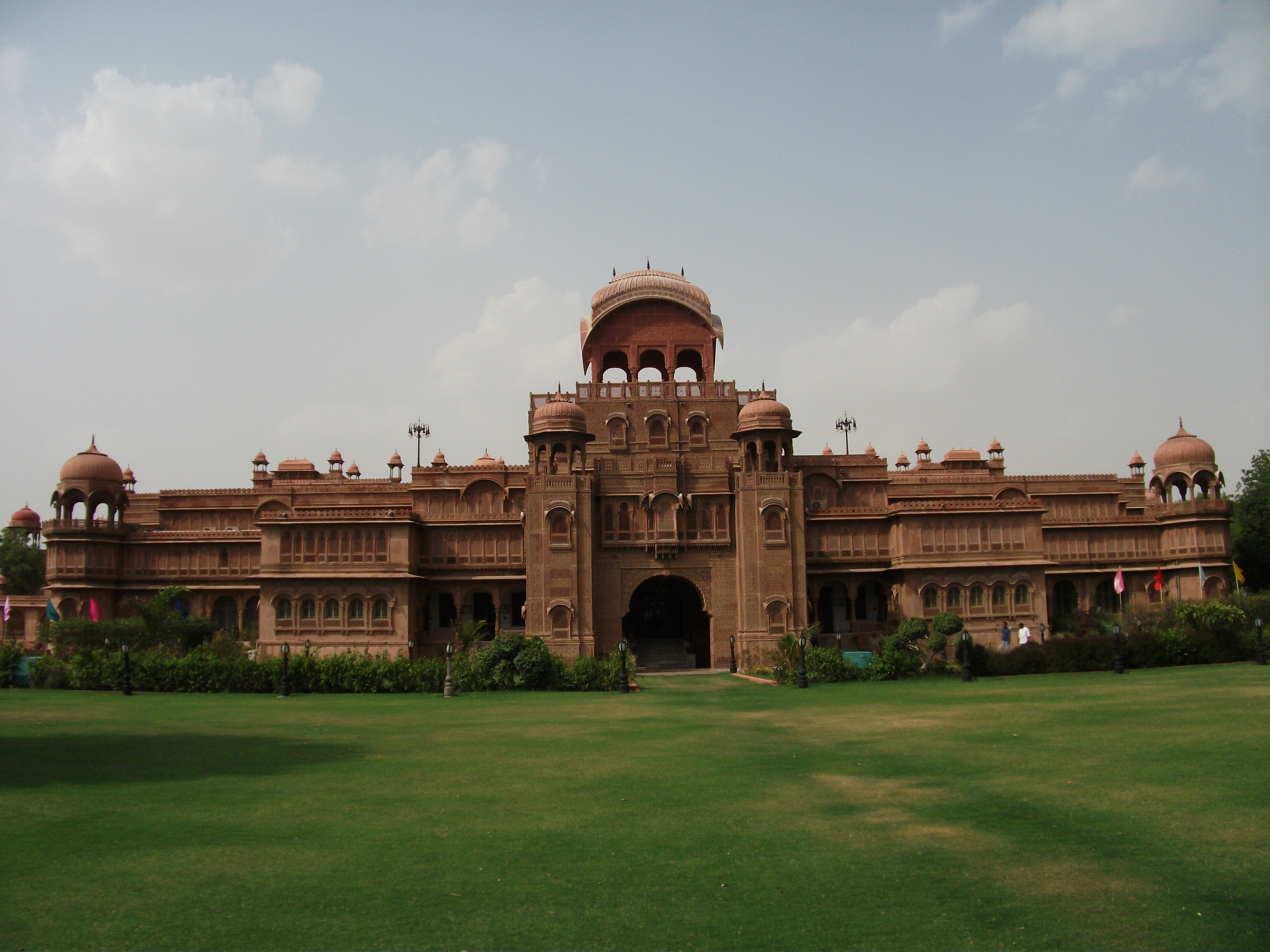
Laxmi Niwas Palace, Bikaner

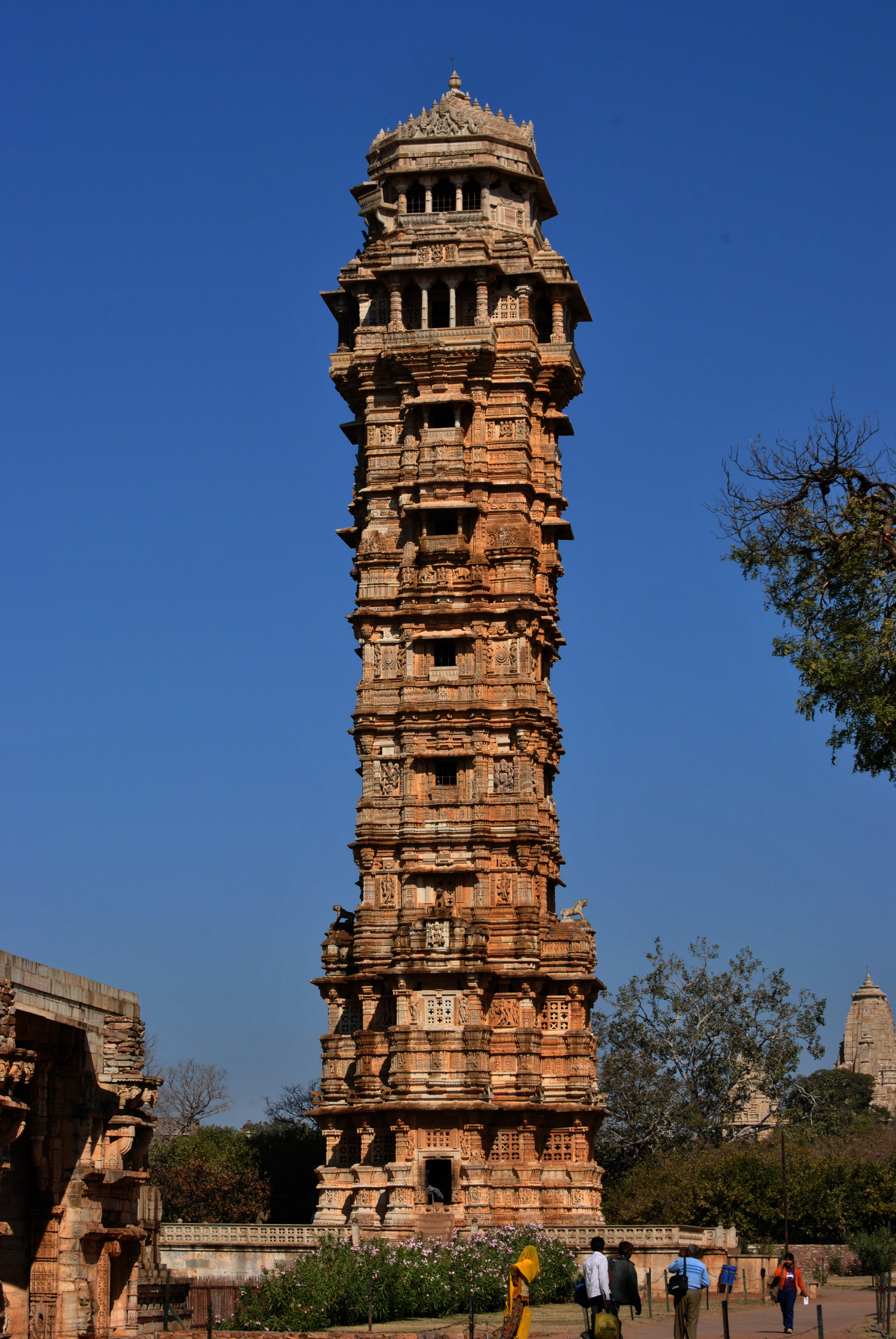
Vijaya Stambha, Chittorgarh

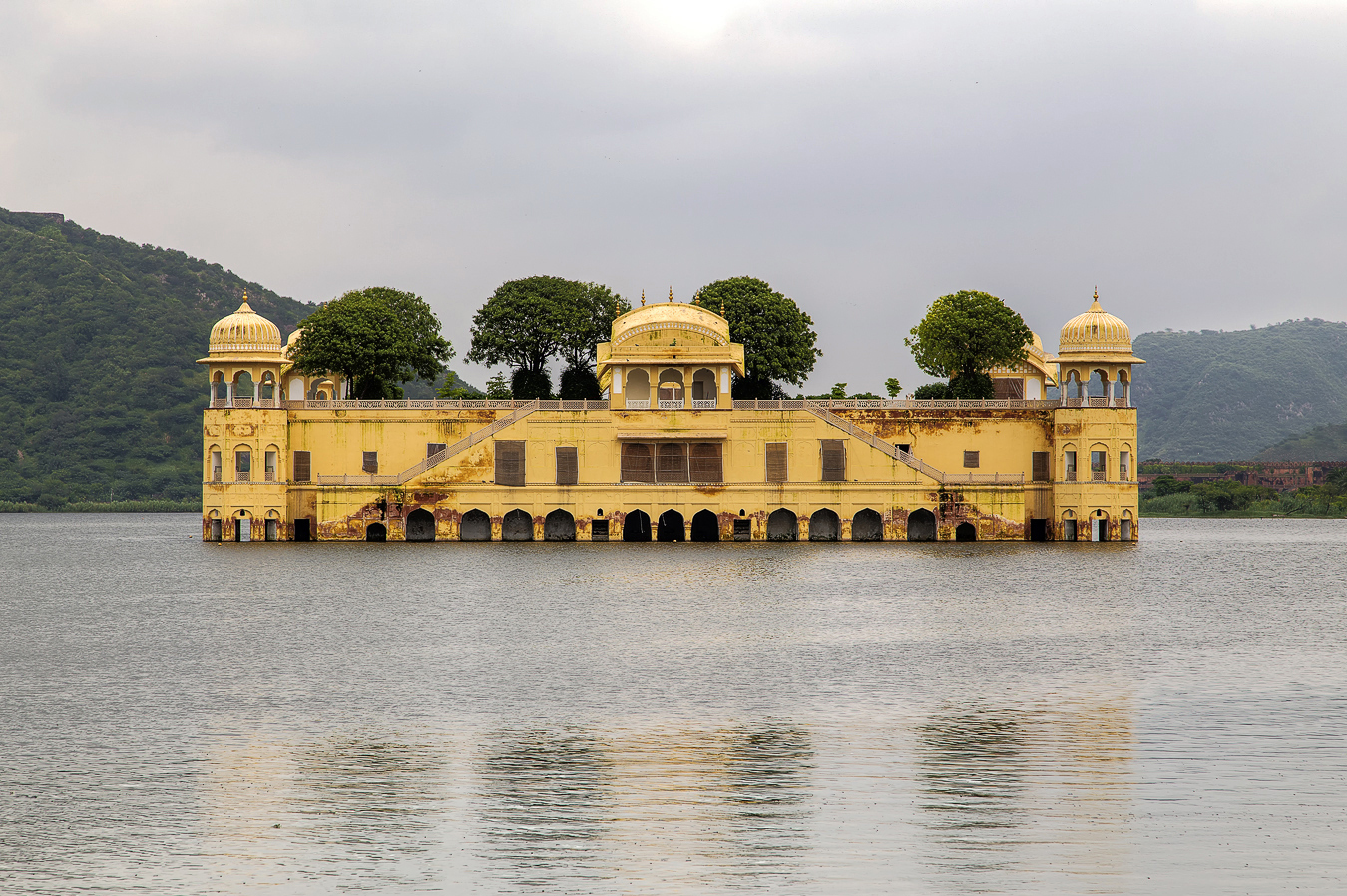
Jal Mahal, Jaipur

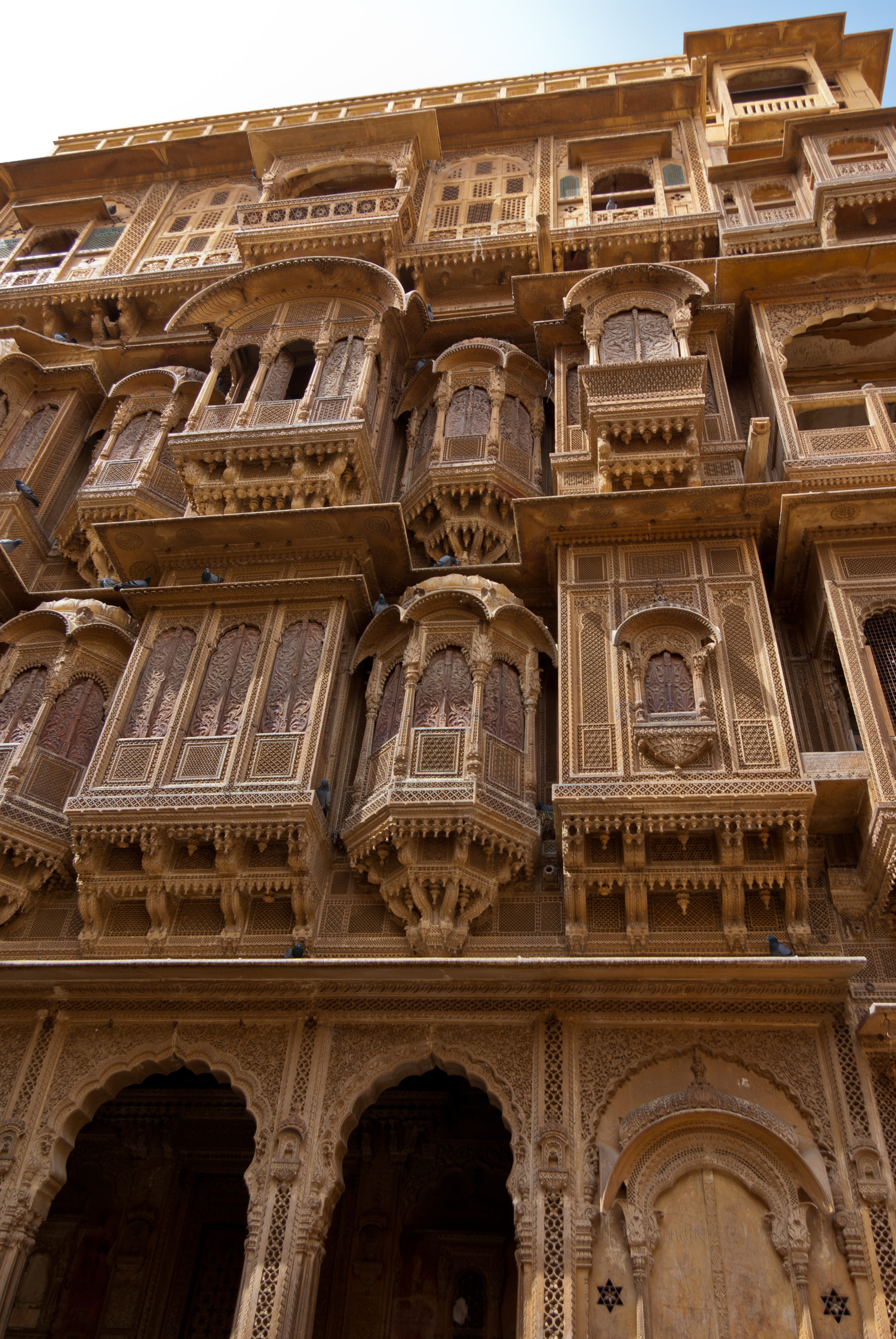
Patwon Ji Ki Haveli, Jaisalmer

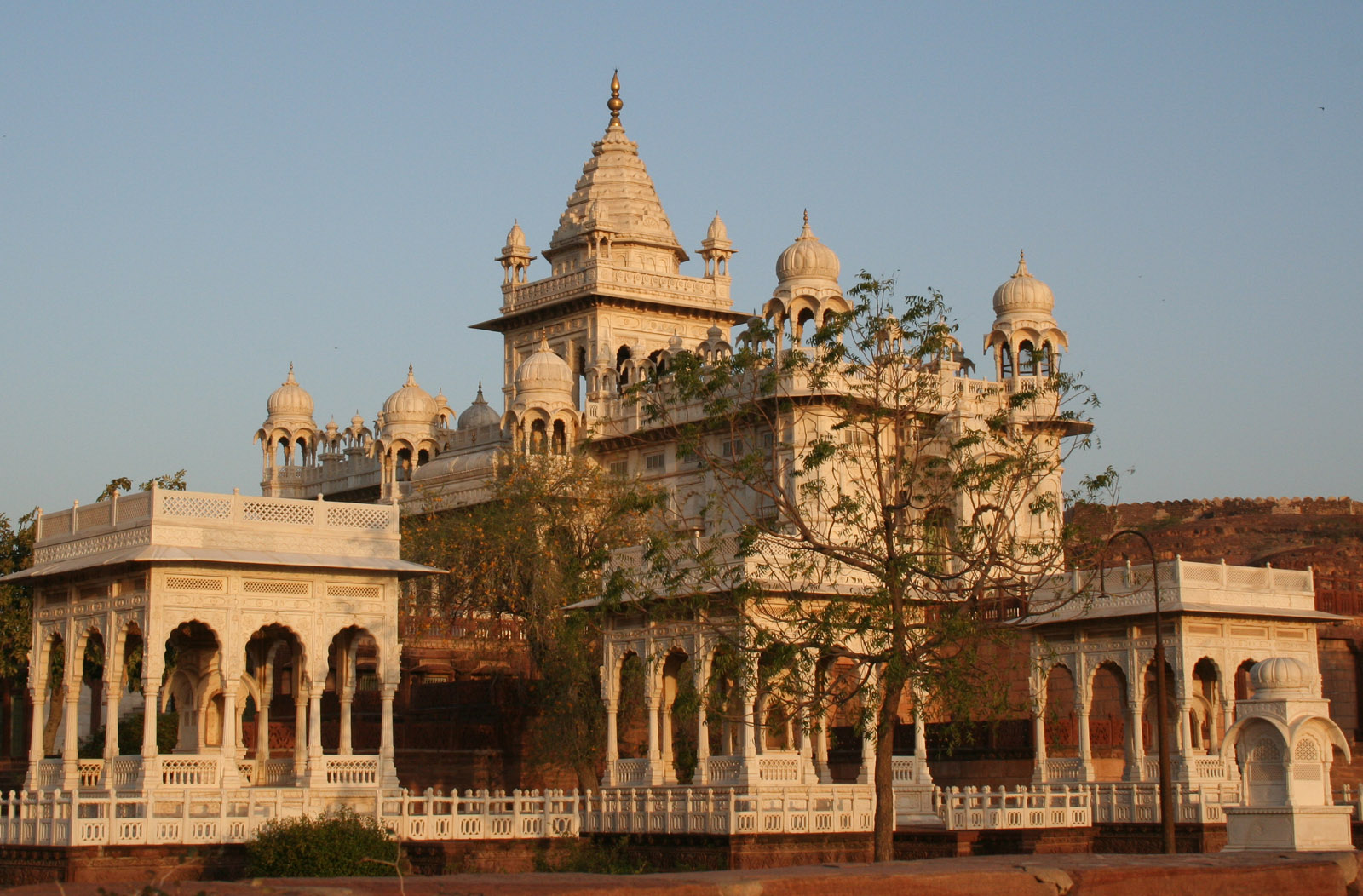
Jaswant Thada, Jodhpur

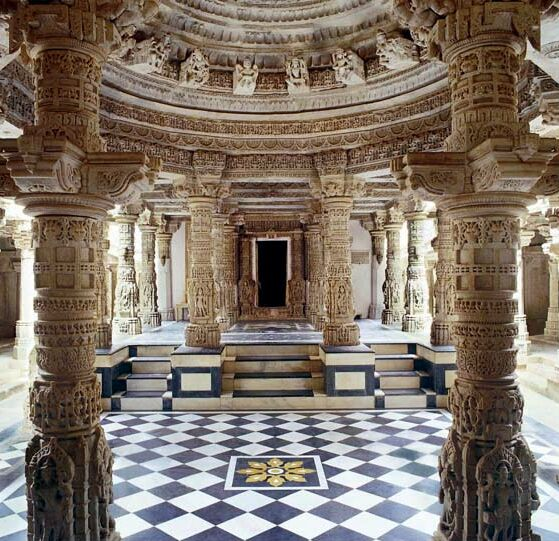
Dilwara Temples, near Mount Abu

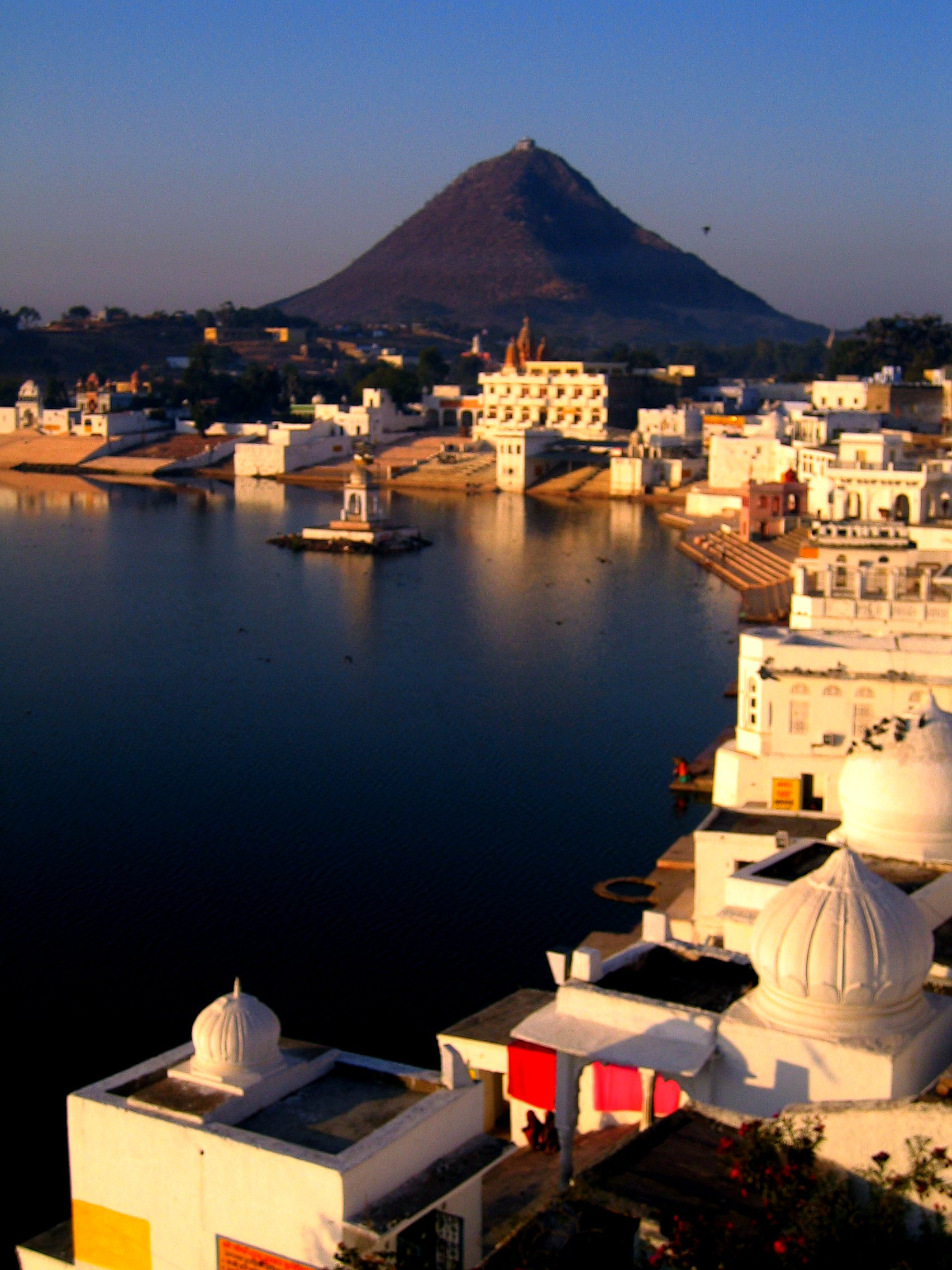
Ghats at Pushkar lake, Pushkar

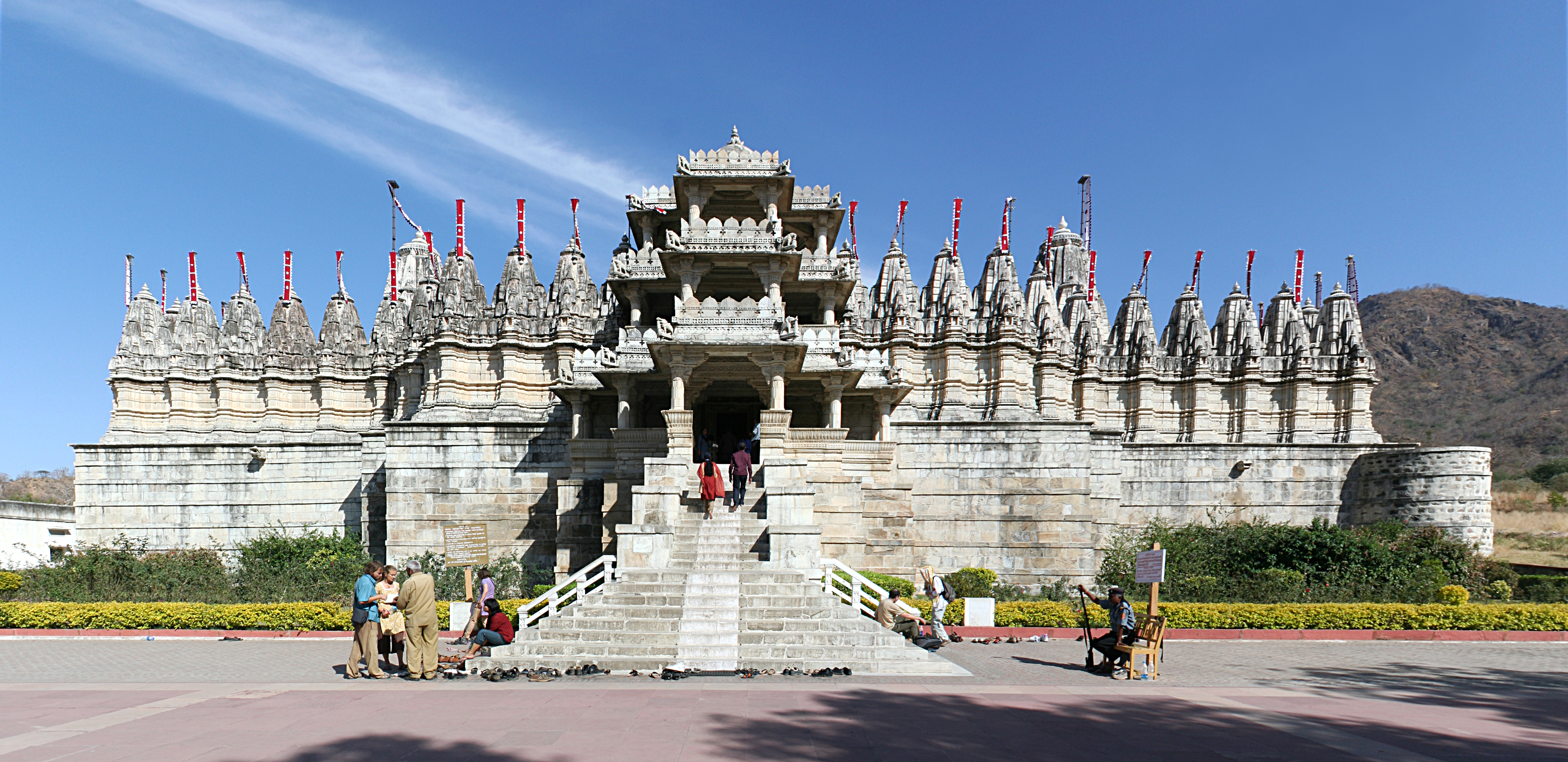
Ranakpur Jain Temple, Ranakpur

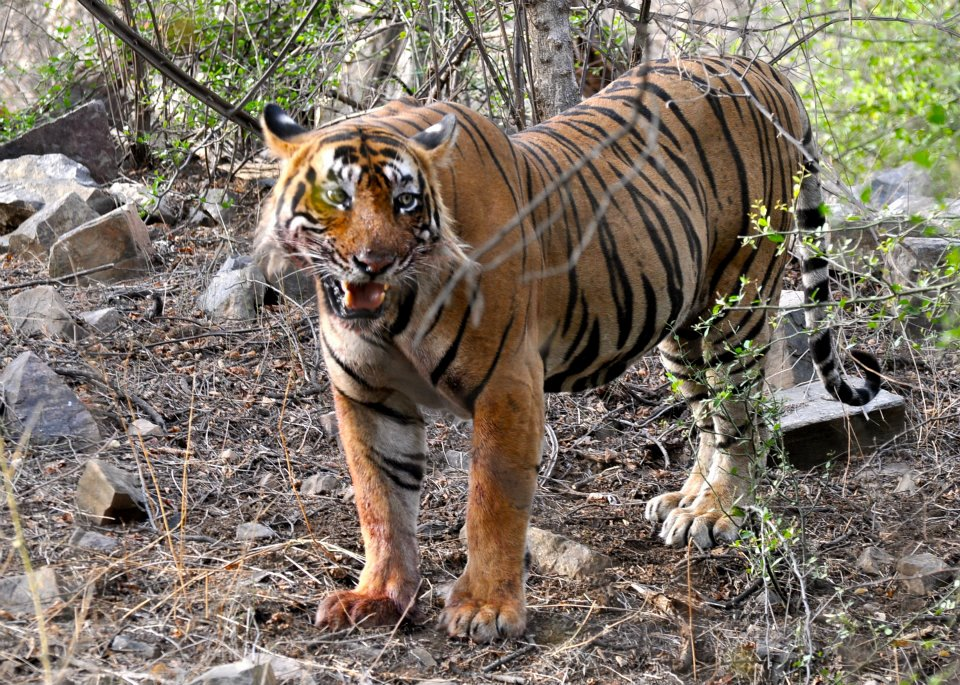
Tiger in Ranthambore National Park

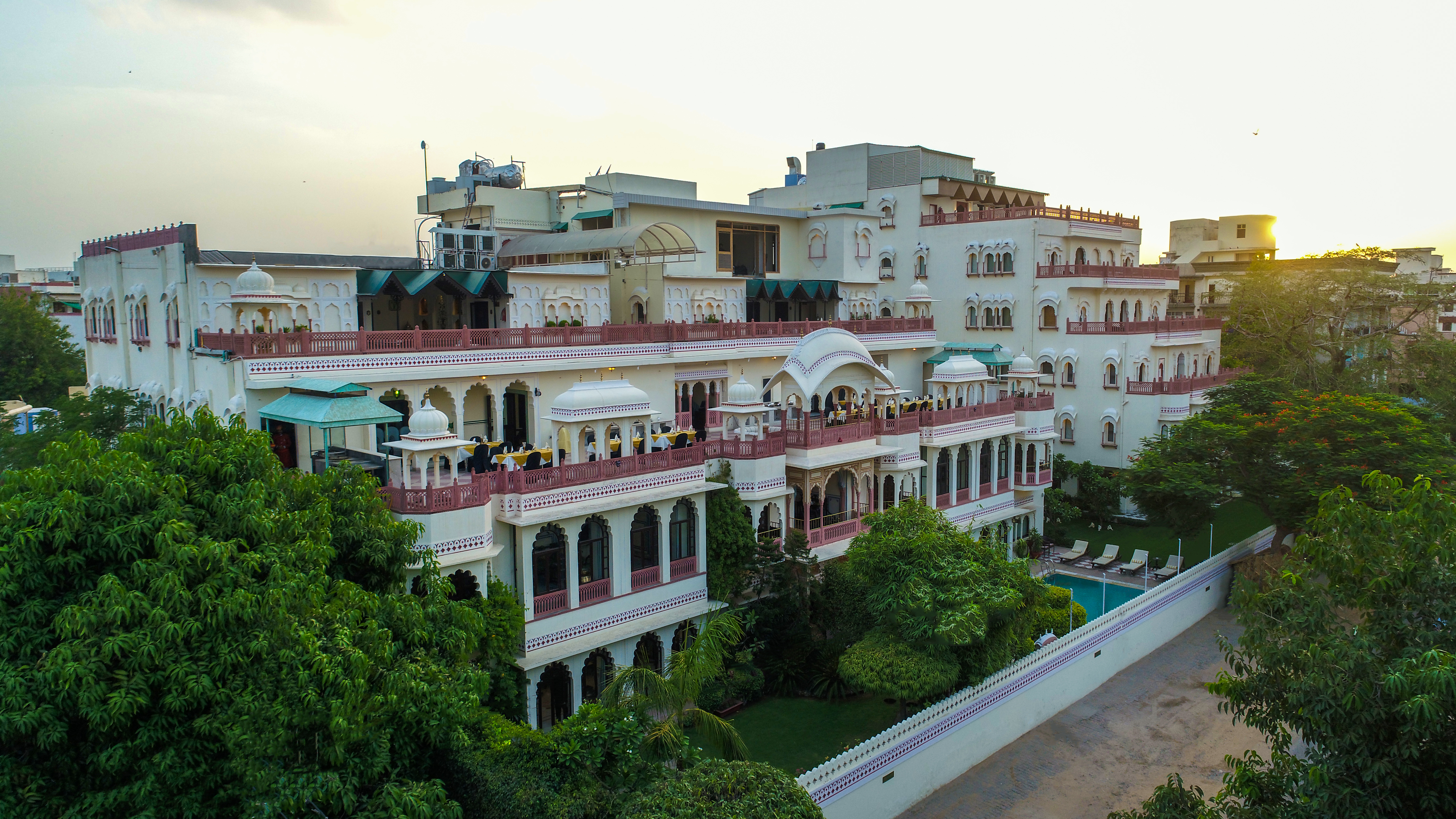
Shahpura Haveli, Shekhawati

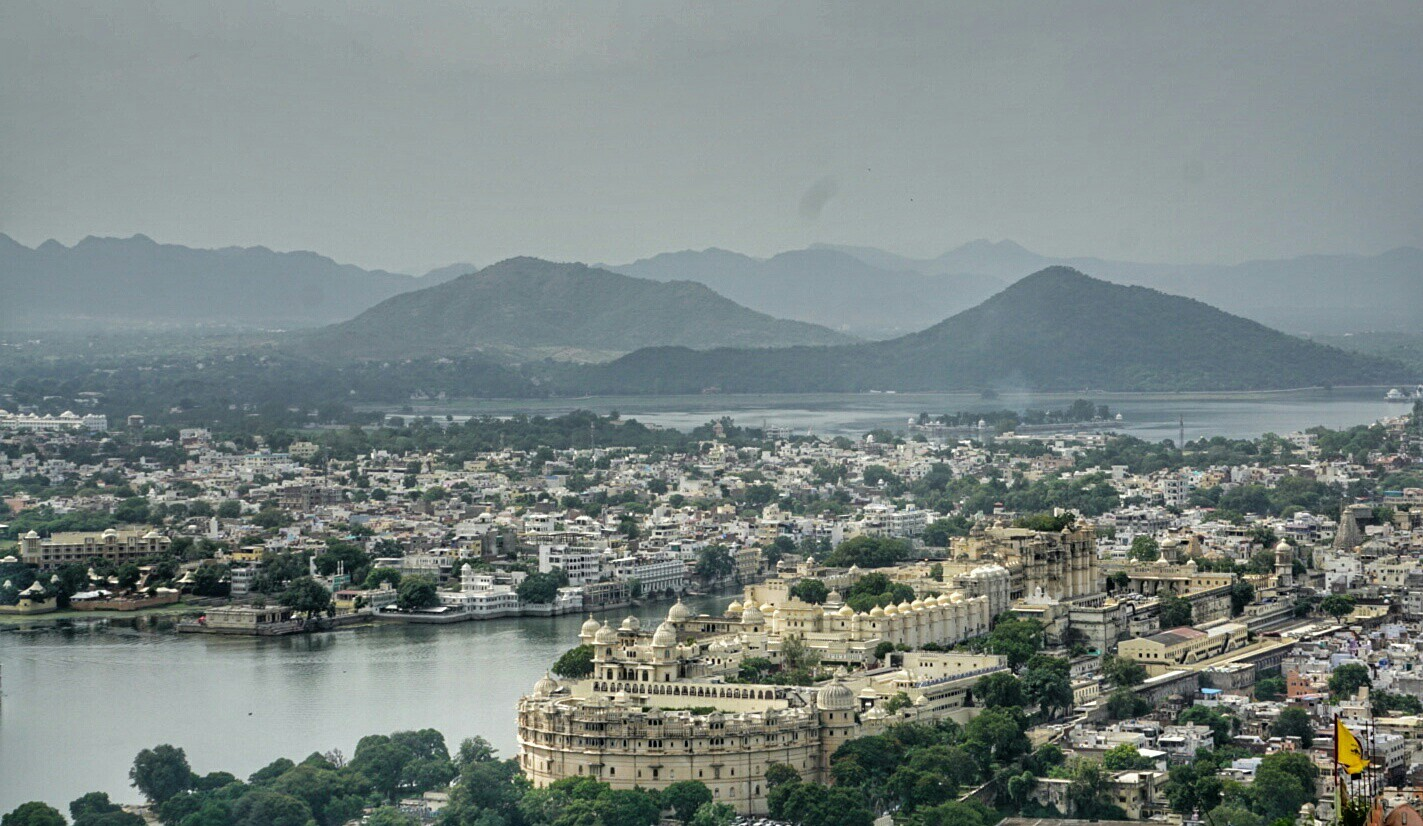
City Palace, Udaipur

== See also ==
- List of attractions in Jaipur
- Palace on Wheels
- Tourist Attractions in Udaipur
