= Hathiagor Buddhist Caves =

Buddhist caves in Rajasthan, India

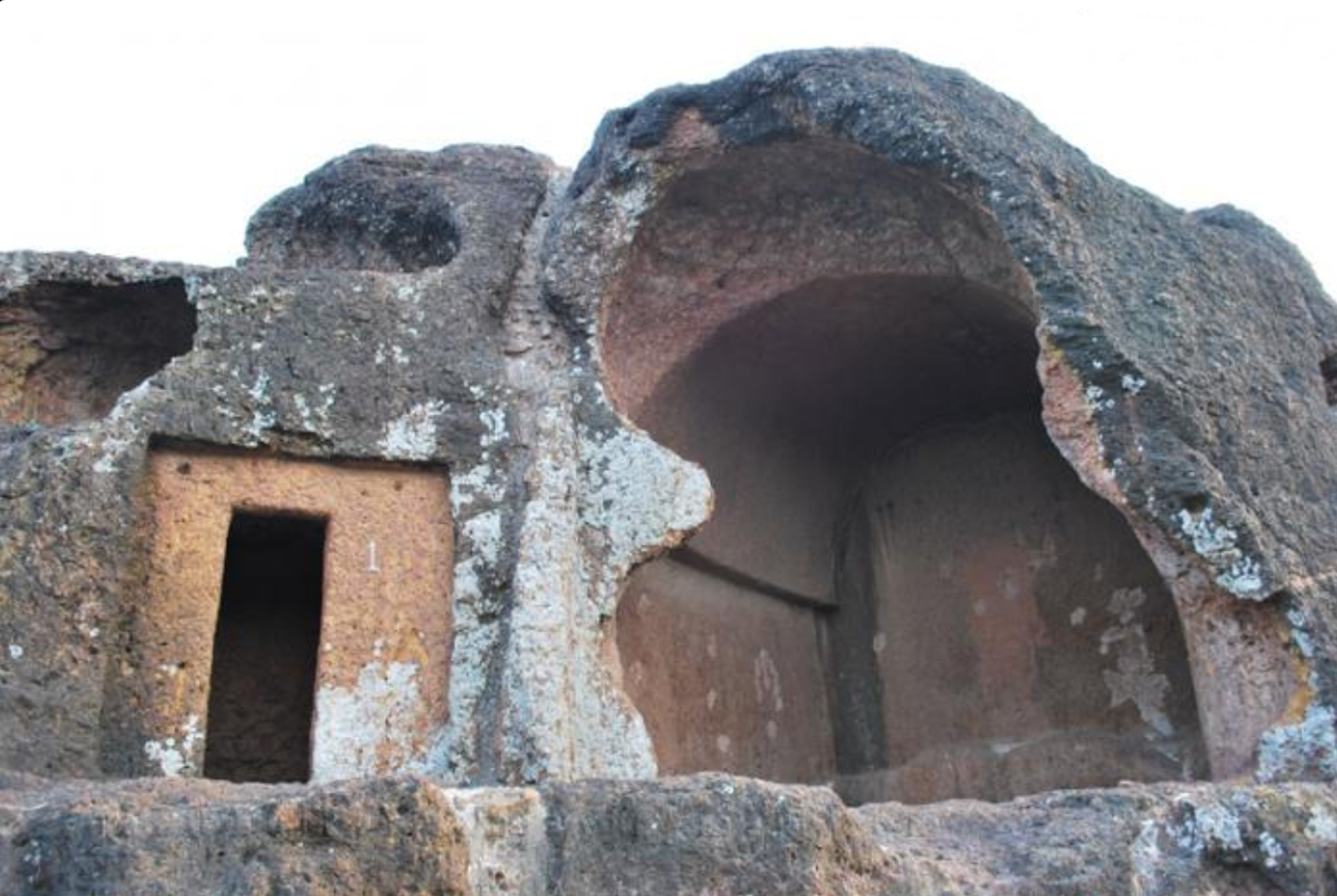
- Hathiagor Buddhist Caves

- Location within India
- 24.1105556°N 75.8644444°E

Hathiagor Buddhist Caves are located at village Pagaria in the state of Rajasthan, India. The caves are located on hill called Hathiagor-ki-Pahadi. The group has five caves measuring 5 m x 5 m x 7 m. A stupa is located closer to the caves.

== See also ==
PROTECTED MONUMENTS BY ARCHAEOLOGICAL SURVEY OF INDIA IN RAJASTHAN Some Buddhist Antiquities and Monuments of Rajasthan
