= Savitri Mata Mandir =

Hindu temple of Goddess Savitri

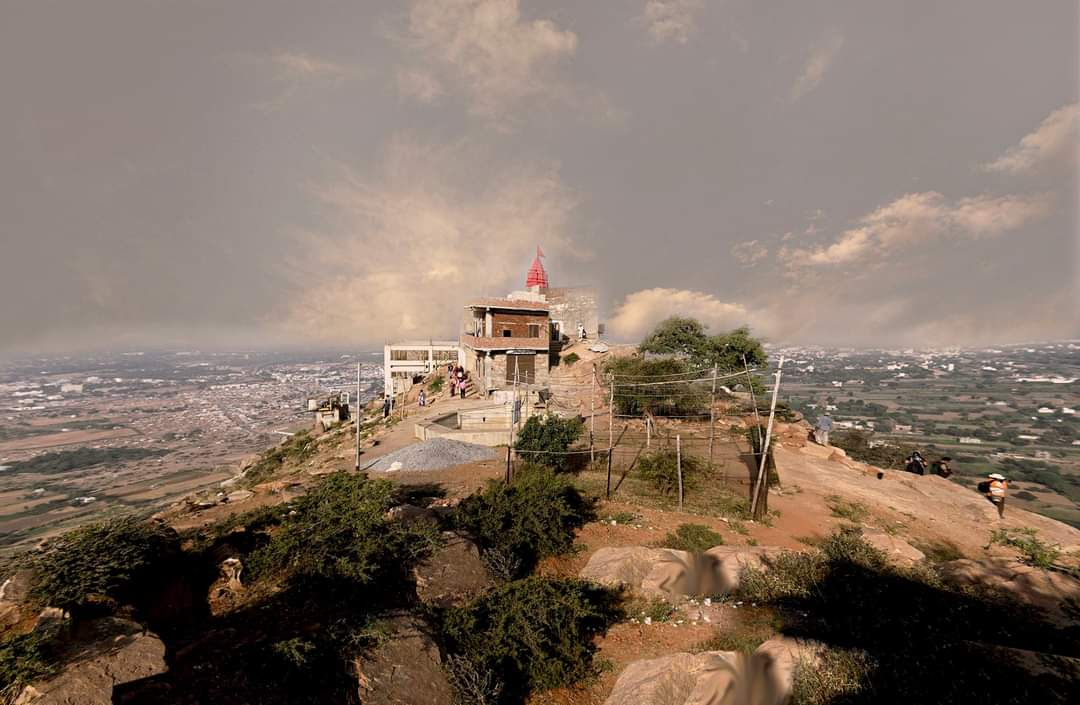

Religion
- Affiliation: Hinduism
- Deity: Savitri

Location
- Location: Pushkar
- State: Rajasthan
- Country: India

Architecture
- Type: Hindu temple architecture

Savitri Mata Mandir or Savitri Temple is a Hindu temple of Goddess Savitri located in Ratnagiri hill which is a popular pilgrimage site in Pushkar, Ajmer district, Rajasthan, India. Savitri Mata Mandir is a hilltop Hindu temple. The temple is situated at an elevation of about 750 ft and a flight of 970 steps to Savitri temple, which is one of the most significant temple in India. Idols of both the wives of Lord Brahma named Savitri and Gayatri are established in this temple.

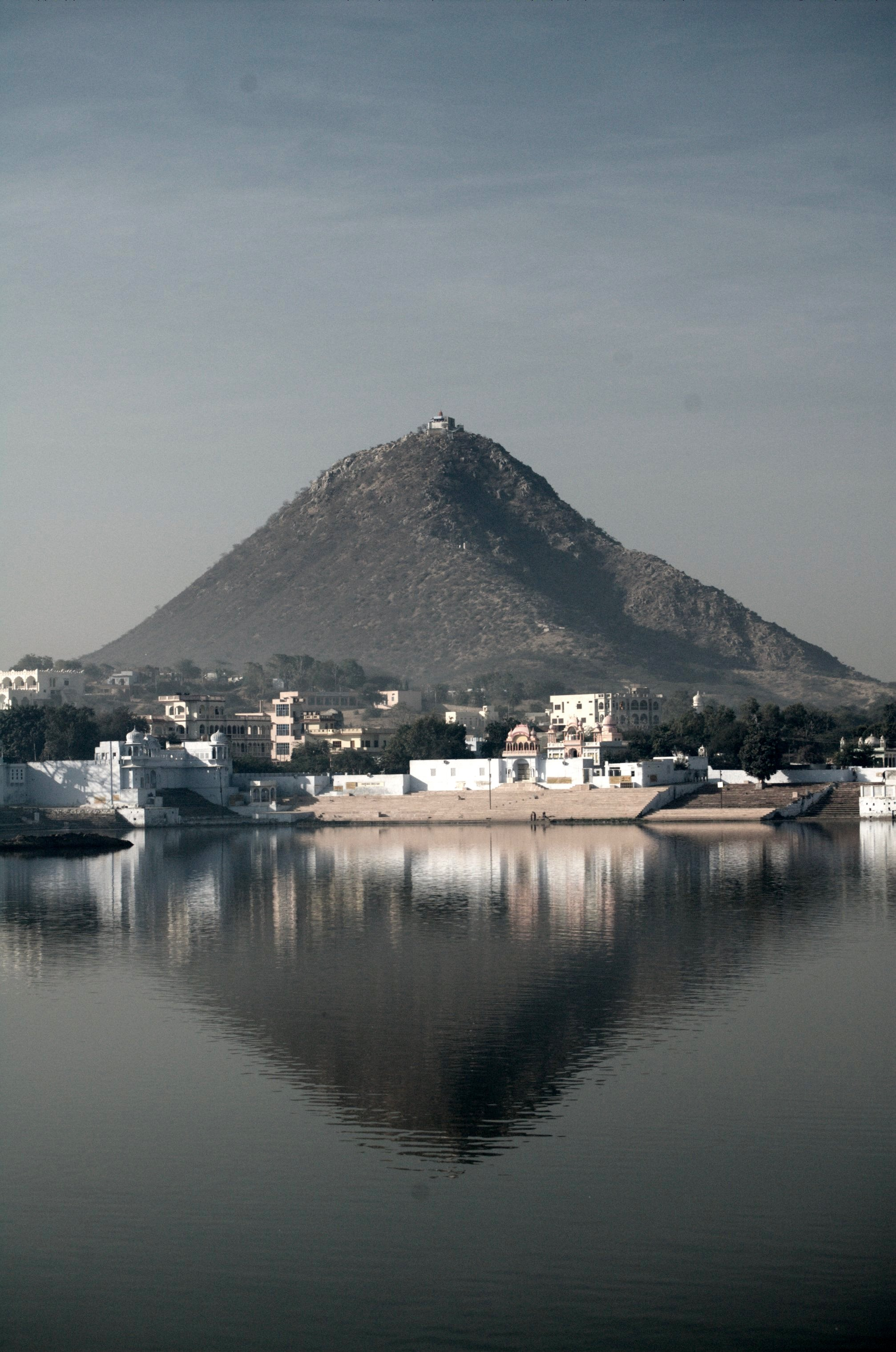
The Savithri temple on top of Ratnagiri hills, overlooking the Pushkar lake

The temple has three idols. Goddess Savitri is in the middle flanked by Goddess Sharda on the right side and Goddess Saraswati on the left.

According to the Hindu calendar, Jagarana is organized on the night of Saptami of Bhado month at the temple of Mata Savitri situated on the Savitri Hill. The temple is open on all days of the week from 5 am to 12 pm and 4 pm to 9 pm. There is no entry fee. Pilgrims can reach at Satvitri Mata Mandir by footsteps or ropeway.

== See also ==
- Pushkar Lake
- Brahma Temple
