= Bhishma Ashtami =

Hindu observance

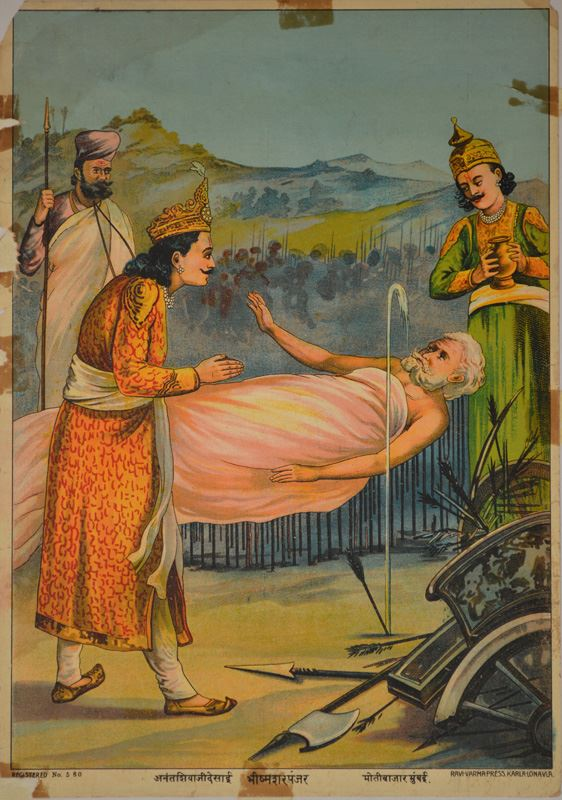
Bhishma upon a bed of arrows, Ravi Varma Press

Bhishma Ashtami (Sanskrit: भीष्माष्टमी, romanized: Bhīṣmāṣṭamī) is a Hindu observance that commemorates the death anniversary of Bhishma, a character in the Hindu epic Mahabharata. Bhishma is regarded to have chosen to die on the battlefield of Kurukshetra, during the propitious period known as the Uttarayana. Bhishma Ashtami is observed during the month of Magha in the Hindu calendar. It corresponds to the months of January–February.

== Description ==
Bhishma Ashtami is a minor holiday observed in Bengal and parts of southern India in remembrance of Bhishma, a warrior who is believed to have fought and died in the Kurukshetra War, featured in the Mahabharata. According to the epic, Bhishma was the son of Shantanu, who had given his son a boon in that he would be allowed to choose his own day of death (Icchāmṛtyu). Bhishma had taken an oath not to marry and that he would ever remain faithful to his father's throne.

The anniversary of Bhishma's death is observed during Magha Shukla Ashtami, the eighth day of the fortnight of the month of Magha. According to the legend associated with the day, Bhishma waited for 58 days before leaving his body so that he would pass on the auspicious day of Uttarayana, which marks the northward passage of the sun after completing the six-month period of Dakshinayana. Hindus believe that the one who dies during Uttarayana goes to heaven.

== Date ==
Year	Date (IST)	Date (EDT)
2017	Saturday, 4 February	Saturday, 4 February
2018	Thursday, 25 January	Thursday, 25 January
2019	Wednesday, 13 February	Tuesday, 12 February
2020	Sunday, 2 February	Saturday, 1 February
2021	Saturday, 20 February	Friday, 19 February
2022	Wednesday, 8 February	Tuesday, 7 February
2023	Saturday, 28 January	Friday, 27 January
2024	Friday, 16 February	Thursday, 15 February

== Religious practices ==
- Adherents observe the ritual of ‘Ekodishta Shraddha’ in the honour of Bhishma.
- Adherents visit the nearby river banks and do the tarpana ritual in order to bring peace to Bhishma's soul. They also honour their ancestors through the same ritual.
- Adherents take a holy dip in the Ganga river and offer boiled rice and sesame seeds in order to be released from samsara and purify their souls.
- Adherents observe fast during the day and perform arghyam (offering) and chant the Bhishma Ashtami mantra to seek the deity's blessings.
- Parents render offerings in Bhishma's name in hopes that their sons inherit virtues similar to him.
