= Bhishma Parva =

Sixth book of the Mahabharata

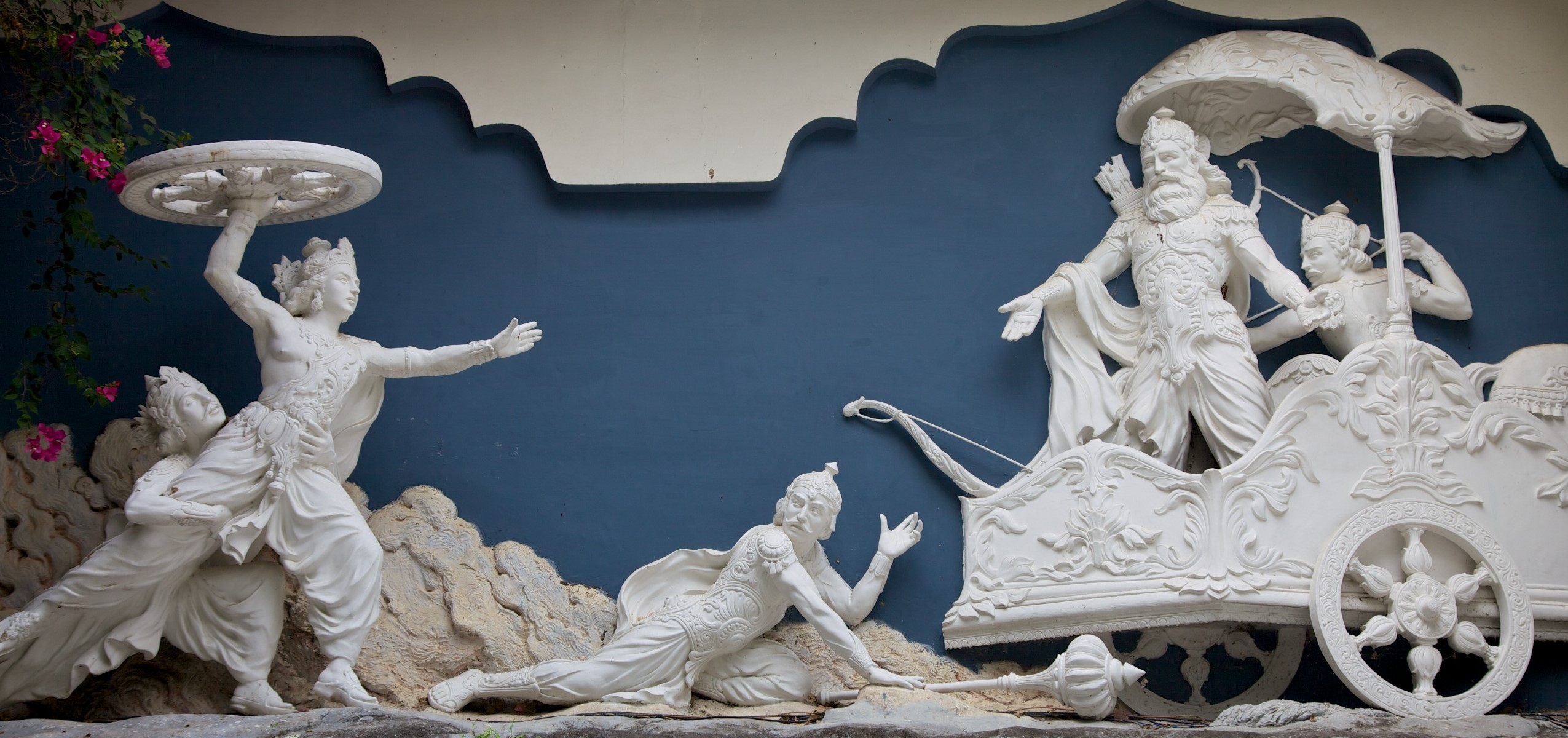
Bhishma Parva describes the first 10 days of the great war between Pandavas and Kauravas. One of the events narrated in it, in which Krishna (left) attacks the titular character, is depicted in the sculpture. Bhishma Parva also includes Bhagavad Gita, the dialogue between Arjuna and Krishna on why and when war must be fought, dharma, and the paths to liberation.

The Bhishma Parva (Sanskrit: भीष्म पर्व) ("Book of Bhishma") is the sixth of the eighteen parvas (books) of the Indian epic Mahabharata. It has 4 sub-books and 124 chapters.

The Bhishma Parva describes the first 10 days of the 18-day Kurukshetra War and its consequences. It recites the story of Bhishma, the commander in chief of the Kauravan armies, who is fatally injured and loses his ability to lead. This book of the Mahabharata includes the widely studied Bhagavad Gita, sometimes referred to as Gita, or The Song of the Lord, or The Celestial Song. Chapters of the Bhagavad Gita describe Arjuna's questioning of the purpose of war, the ultimate effects of violence, and the meaning of life. Arjuna's doubts and metaphysical questions are answered by Krishna. Other treatises in the Bhishma Parva include the just war theory in ancient India, as well as strategies and tactics. The book describes the deaths of Uttar (brother-in-law of Abhimanyu and brother of Uttara, the wife of Abhimanyu), and also Bhishma's fall, respectively on the 1st and 10th days of the war. Karna did not fight in these first ten days, on Bhishma's orders.

== Structure and chapters ==
The Bhishma Parva traditionally has 4 upa-parvas (parts, little books) and 124 adhyayas (chapters).

=== Karna-khanda Vinirmana Parva (chapters: 1–10) ===
Karna suggests the Kauravas and Hastinapura to fight on the land of Kurukshetra.

The Parva begins with a meeting of two sides where the rules of war are agreed upon. Rishi Veda Vyasa, the grandfather to both Kauravas and Pandavas, offers the gift of sight to King Dhritarashtra – who is blind – so he can foresee the tragedy about to unfold. Dhritarashtra declines the offer, claiming he does not want to witness the slaughter of his family and friends. Vyasa then offers a celestial vision to Sanjaya, to have knowledge of everything, manifest or concealed, even thoughts. While the war was in progress weapons would not harm him. He will describe the war to blind Dhritarashtra. Vyasa then makes a final attempt at appealing to Dhritarashtra, to seek peace and avoid the war. Dhritarashtra confides that his sons do not listen to him. Vyasa counsels that war is evil, victory in war is uncertain, and only sorrow and slaughter on all sides is certain, no matter who wins.

=== Bhumi Parva (chapters: 11–12) ===
Sanjaya continues to describe the world. He mentions island nations, nations without kings, lands with white people, black people, mixed-race people, celestial gems, an ocean of milk, and ghee. Then he describes the planets seen at night, why they are believed to be globes, that the light-giving sun, too, is a very large sphere according to calculations of Arka, with eclipses occurring when planets temporarily cover the sun or moon. Such is the merit of the world we live in, says Sanjaya.

=== Bhagavad-gita Parva (chapters: 1–42) ===
Dhritarashtra asks Sanjaya for the details of the war over the ten days. Sanjaya describes how Bhishma marshaled the Kaurava army by declaring, "to die at home is a waste of life, a chance to die in battle for a cause is the highest honor a man can have." Arjuna described the Kaurava army as one with 100,000 elephants trained for war, 1 million chariots, 1 million horsemen, archers, and soldiers with swords and shields. Learning about this vast army, Yudhishthira is filled with grief. Arjuna reminds him that Narada told him that where there is Dharma there is Krishna and where there is Krishna there is victory. Arjuna believed that Vedas were told by God that to attain godhood, one must become a monk by leaving home and birth-caste. As Krishna had demanded five villages for settlement so Arjuna asks his charioteer Krishna whether he should become a monk or fight (Bhagavad Gita, Chapter 1, Shloka 36).

Arjuna asks Krishna to bring the chariot between the two assembled armies, to see who were assembled to fight. He sees family and friends on both sides. Introspectively, Arjuna wonders if their cause justifies the bloodbath. War only kills, it arouses only hate among human beings. Arjuna tells Krishna, "I seek neither victory nor a kingdom." Arjuna doubts whether war is ever justified. To Arjuna's doubts, Krishna gives various answers. These answers range from the nature of life to the demands of justice, to the three paths of liberated and free life, to human duty, and are collectively called the Bhagavad Gita.

Krishna allows Arjuna to view his extraordinary, divine form. Arjuna apologizes for not being able to recognize him as divine, and for the disrespect he had shown, if he had said anything carelessly in the past, and regards Krishna as a friend. Beholding Arjuna taking up his divine bow Gandiva, the Pandavas utter a tremendous shout. Then come the gods with Indra, with the desire of witnessing the great slaughter to come.

Just before the war, Yudhishthira takes off his armor, comes down off his chariot, and, in namaste pose, walks over to the enemy's side. His brothers, amazed by his act, join him and walk across the no man's land separating the forces. Yudhishthira, with his brothers, meets and bows before the enemy generals and their preceptors—Bhishma, Drona, Kripa, and Shalya—one by one, to seek their permission and blessings to fight them to the death. Bhishma, moved by this humane action, says he admires their humanity and wishes them to obtain victory. Yudhishthira asks him, how shall they, in battle, vanquish him. Bhishma refuses by saying his time is not yet come. Then he goes to Drona with the same desire. Drona blesses him with victory and says, as long as he fights, they cannot vanquish him. Then he goes to Kripa with the same intent. Kripa, too, blesses him and says it is difficult to slay him. At last to Shalya, and reminds him of the boon he granted, to weaken, in battle, the energy of Surya's son Karna. Shalya says he will look after his victory and his wish shall be realized. With choked voices and tears, their soldiers cheer the Pandava brothers for their obeisance and show of respect for the enemy. Yudhishthira and the Pandava brothers return to their side. Vasudeva goes to Radha's son and asks him to come to his side as long as Bhishma is not slain. Karna said he will not do anything disagreeable to his friend. Hearing these words of Karna, Krishna ceases and heads back to his side. Yuyutsu, moved by Yudhishthira's speech, abandons his Kaurava brothers and goes over to the Pandava side. Yudhishthira joyfully accepts. The conches signal the start of the war.

=== Bhishma-vadha Parva (chapters: 43–124) ===
1st day of war

On the first day, flying arrows cover the sky and a cloud of dust obscures the sun. The twang of bowstrings and battle cries of the two sides creates a tempest of sound. Arjuna goes against Ganga's son. Satyaki rushes against Kritavarma. Duryodhana struggles in the battle against Bhima. Dushasana rushes against Nakula. Yudhishthira himself encounters Shalya, the ruler of Madra. Dushtdyumna rushes against Drona. Ghatotkacha and Alamvusha, both Rakshashas, encounter each other. Sikhdandin rushes against Drona's son, Ashvatthama. Bhagadatta battles Virata. Drupada rushes against Jayadratha. And a general engagement took place between all others. In that frightful and terrible battle, Bhishma causes divisions of Pandavas to waver. Bhishma, protected by five mighty car-warriors, penetrates the Pandava host. Abhimanyu, in wrath, resists all those car-warriors. In that fierce combat, the mighty Bhishma aims many low-level, air-borne celestial weapons at Abhimanyu, who is then protected by ten great bowmen and car-warriors, with Bhima, Dhrishtadyumna, and Satyaki among them. Uttara engages Shalya, cripples Shalya's chariot. Shalya then hurls an iron dart, slaying Uttara outright. Sweta beholding his brother slain, blazes up in wrath and rushes with the desire of slaying Shalya.

Sweta kills hundreds of Kaurava noble princes. Bhishma seeing this destruction impetuously rushes to that side, against Sweta. In that battle, both destroy each other's chariots, cut their bows, and pierce each other. When Bhishma gets the advantage in the fight, there come to Sweta's rescue many car-warriors, with Satyaki, Bhima, Dhrishtadyumna, and Abhimanyu among them. Bhishma checks all those car-warriors alone, until Drona, Kripa, and Shalya come to aid Bhishma, who then takes out an arrow, nocking and powering it with Brahma energy, releases it with such a force that it pierces through Sweta armor and body, and sticks into the earth. Arjuna slowly withdraws his Pandava troops from that side. Later, Virata's son, Sankha, rushes, with the desire to slay Shalya. Bhishma comes roaring to that side, against a trembling Pandava host. Then, Arjuna, to protect Sankha from Bhishma, quickly places himself in front of him and engages Bhisma. Bhishma destroys Sankha's car, and Arjuna retreats towards Drupada, the king of the Panchalas. Bhishma kills numerous Pandava soldiers. The conches and drums blare to mark the end of that day's war, and both sides withdraw their troops. Duryodhana is filled with delight, beholding Bhishma in battle. Whereas Yudhishthira is filled with grief and consults Janardhana. He consults the commander of his army, Dhrishtadyumna, to change the array of his army, in the name of Krauncharuma, for the next day.

2nd day of war

On the second day, conches blare the restart of war. Bhishma shows his terrible prowess by showering arrows upon Abhimanyu, Arjuna, Virata, Dhrishtadyumna, and many others, and causes the mighty array of the Pandavas to waver. Car divisions of the Pandavas begin to fly away. Then Arjuna, beholding Bhishma annihilating his host, angrily tells Krishna to proceed to that place where the grandsire is, to slay him. Sanjaya comments about who else saves Bhishma, Drona, and Karna are capable of advancing in the battle against the bearer of Gandiva and have a chance against him. Arjuna encounters a group protecting Bhishma and battles with them. Satyaki, Virata, Dhrishtadyumna, five sons of Draupadi and Abhimanyu come to support him. Duryodhana demands that Bhishma do something about Arjuna. Battle commences between both parties, with Bhishma against Arjuna. Arjuna was not fighting a war with all his power, because his wish was not to hurt his beloved grandsire, so the duel lasts for a long time, with neither of them vanquishing the other.

Drona battles Dhrishtadyumna and cuts his bow three times and destroys his chariot twice. Dhrishtadyumna, taking a shield and a large scimitar, rushes towards Drona, but Drona repulses him. Bhima rescues him. Duryodhana sends the Kalingan army to check Bhima. Drona, abandoning Dhrishtadyumna, encounters Virata and Drupada together. Bhima alone battles the whole Kalingan army. When Bhima's chariot is destroyed, he kills an enemy prince by hurling a mace. Then, taking up a sword, Bhima leaps onto an elephant from the tusk, divides the rider down the middle with his huge sword, cutting the elephant's neck while descending, destroying cavalry and infantry by whirling and wheeling, slaying all in his wake. In that battle, they no longer regard Bhima, as a human being. Ashoka aids Bhima and mounts him on his chariot. Bhima then continues killing the remaining warriors. Bhima dispatches 2700 warriors to the region of death. Kalinga's army shakes with terror and flees, Bhima pursuing. Shikhandi, Dhrishtadyumna, and Satyaki aid Bhima. Bhishma, hearing those cries in battle, quickly proceeds towards Bhima. Bhishma faces a whole group of combatants. Bhishma slays Bhima's steeds. Satyaki, charioteer of Kuru's grand-sire, is felled with a shaft. Bhishma steeds become alarmed and take him away. They then celebrate their victory. Dhrishtadyumna engages in battle with Drona's sons, Shalya and Kripa, and slays the steeds of Drona's son's car. Abhimanyu comes to aid the prince of Panchalas. Lakshmana, Duryodhana's son, battles Abhimanyu. Duryodhana comes to aid his son; so does Arjuna. Arjuna destroys all those warriors who block his path. Bhishma, with Drona, praises Arjuna's skills and at sunset withdraws their troops. Pandavas win the second day's battle.

3rd day of war

Bhishma forms an array named Garuda. Arjuna disposes his troops in counter-array in the form of a half-moon. Duryodhana sends thousands of car-warriors to battle Arjuna. Abhimanyu and Satyaki slaughter the Sakuni army. Drona and Bhishma slaughter division of Pandavas. Bhima and Ghatotkacha scare away Duryodhana, whose charioteer speedily bears him away. Duryodhana requests that Bhishma not to favor Pandavas. Bhishma says for him he will check the sons of Pandu. Bhishma slaughters a vast host of Pandavas and in consequence of his prowess that vast army is routed. Partha, as per Vasudeva's words, rushes to encounter Bhishma. Arjuna cuts Bhishma's bow two times and, in return, is praised by him. Bhishma mangles both Vasudeva and Arjuna with keen shafts. Krishna wonders, beholding Bhishma prowess. A group attacks Arjuna, and Arjuna slays all of them. Then, Arjuna, invoking the wonderful and terrible Mahendra weapon and causing it to appear in the sky, showers arrows on the Kaurava host. So many Kaurava and Pandava soldiers are killed that streams of blood flow on the battlefield. Both sides withdraw their forces for the night's rest. Pandava's army celebrates their victory and praises Arjuna for achieving the feat of slaying more than 10,000 warriors in that day's battle.

4th day of war

The fourth-day war starts, with Bhishma avoiding Abhimanyu, who encounters Partha. Abhimanyu fights a group with Ashvatthama among them. An army surrounds Arjuna, with his son Abhimanyu, hoping to slay them both. Dhristadyumna, beholding them both surrounded by the foe, with his division comes to aid them. Shalya battles Dhrishtadyumna and cuts off his bow. Abhimanyu comes to aid Dhrishtadyumna. A melee occurs there. Bhima terrifies the Kaurava brothers and makes them flee to save Duryodhana. Duryodhana sends the Magadha division, consisting of 10,000 elephants, to advance towards Bhima. Bhima, mace in hand, jumps down from his car and, uttering a roar, rushes towards the elephant division. He starts to slaughter those divisions and routs that large part of the army. Alamvusha (Rakshasa) battles Satyaki. Later, Bhurisravas battles Satyaki. Duryodhana and his brothers battle against Bhima.

Duryodhana breaks Bhima's bow and afflicts his charioteer Visoka by his shafts, in return his bow is broken by Bhima. In a rage, Duryodhana aims a terrible shaft at Bhima, which strikes his chest, and, deeply pierced, he swoons. Abhimanyu comes to aid Bhima. Regaining consciousness, Bhima faces 14 brothers of Kauravas and sends 8 of them to death's domain, shocking Duryodhana. Other brothers fled from the battle for fear of Bhima. Bhagadatta, riding his elephant, battles Bhima. A group of the Pandava army attack Bhagadatta, surrounding him, and striking fear into his elephant with their attack. King Bhagadatta in a rage, strikes Bhima in his chest with his shaft, which causes Bhima to swoon. Ghatotkacha comes to aid his father and, disappearing from view, creates a terrible illusion, reappearing assuming a fierce form, himself riding Airavata created by his power of illusion, with three other elephants following him. They four afflict Bhagdatta's elephants with their tusks, which causes that elephant to utter loud cries. And hearing those terrible and loud cries of that elephant, Bhishma—with Drona, Suyodhana, and other kings—comes to rescue him. Bhishma avoids fighting with Ghatotkacha as the evening was approaching, and withdraws his troops. The Pandavas shout for their victory and worship both heroes: Bhima and his son. King Duryodhana becomes cheerless at the death of his brothers and begins to pass the hours in meditation.

5th day of war

At night, Duryodhana talks with Bhishma. Bhishma tells him that let peace be made with the Pandavas, which Duryodhana ignores. After night passes away, the two armies approach each other for battle. Bhishma arrays his army in the shape of a Makara, and the sons of Pandu form their troops in an array called the Syena (hawk). Bhima and Arjuna battle Bhishma. Duryodhana tell Drona to aid Bhishma. Drona penetrates the Pandava array with his son Ashvatthama. Ashvatthama is stopped by Satyaki and battles him. Bhishma avoids Shikhandi, remembering the femininity of his sex, and Shikhandi approaches Drona, avoiding him from fear. Yudhishthira, with his troops, engages Shalya. Vikarna engages Sahadeva. Bhishma engages in battle with Arjuna. Kripa and Kritavarma both rush against Dhrishtadyumna. Bhima proceeds against vindictive Duryodhana and his brother. Sahadeva battles Sakuni. Yudhishthira goes after the elephant division, to rout it. Satyaki and Abhimanyu, with their troops, battle Shalya and his army. Pandava generalissimo Dhrishtadyumna, engages in battle with Drona. Bhishma checks the mighty Bhima with his troops and breaks his bow. Satyaki comes to aid him. Bhishma, aiming a fierce shaft, fells Satyaki's charioteer, whose steeds bolt away over the field, taking him along. All praise Bhishma for this feat. Bhishma slays Pandava forces.Dhrishtadyumna heads the army while King Virata battles Bhishma. Drona's son battles Arjuna. Arjuna cuts Ashvatthama's bow. Taking up another bow both pierce each other. Arjuna's arrows penetrate through Ashvatthama's armor, drinking his life-blood; but Ashvatthama wavers not, still fighting unperturbed, in that battle, desirous of doing good to his side. All applaud that warrior's feat. The heroic Vibhatsu, showing mercy to the son of his preceptor, avoids him. Abhimanyu faces Lakshmana and slays his four steeds, along with his charioteer. Kripa saves Lakshmana by interrupting. Abhimanyu manages to defeat Kripa. Bhishma, excited by wrath, slays with his celestial weapons the troops of the Pandavas. Duryodhana dispatches 10,000 cars against Satyaki who was slaying his troops; but Satyaki slays with his celestial weapons all those car-warriors, and approaches, with his sons, Bhurisravas for battle. Bhurisravas respectfully challenges him, which he accepts. Bhurisravas cuts off Satyaki's sons' bows, then their heads, with sharp shafts. Satyaki, roaring, rushes against Bhurisravas. They both destroy each other's cars and, jumping down on the ground, start to fight with shields and scimitars. Bhima quickly comes to lift Satyaki on his car, and the Duryodhana brothers do the same to Bhurisravas. Dhanajaya slays a total of 25,000 car-warriors that day. Duryodhana, to slay Partha, surrounds him and his son with a part of the army. Just at that time the sun goes down, causing, as per the rules of war, both sides to retreat.

6th day of war

After night died, battle once more begins. Yudhishthira instructs Dhrishtadyumna to dispose of the troops in the array of Makara. Devavrata, beholding Pandava army thus arrayed, disposes of his army, in counter-array, in the form of a huge crane. Bhima rushes against the division of Bharadvaja's son and dispatches Drona's charioteer to the region of Yama. Drona himself controls his chariot and began to consume the Pandava army. Bhima faces the younger brothers of Duryodhana. Bhima slays 1,000 car-warriors protecting the Kaurava brothers. Then, leaving his car and taking up his mace, goes after his cousins to smite them, penetrating the Dhartarashtra host. Dhrishtadyumna, learning of this, goes after Bhima for his welfare and takes him to his car. Dhristadyumna battles the Kaurava brothers and applies his fierce weapon, called Pramohana, on them. Their senses and strength become afflicted by that weapon, so they flee in all directions. Drona approaches Drupada for battle and pierces him with three shafts.

Deeply pierced by Drona, Drupada leaves the battle. Drona enjoys his victory by blowing his conch. Drona rescues his side by using the Prajna weapon, which neutralizes the Dhristadyumna weapon. Ashvatthama fights Draupadeyas where his chariot is broken by them. The Kaurava brothers proceed towards Bhima and Prishata's son. Yudhishthira sends 12 car-warriors with Abhimanyu and five sons of Draupadi in them, to aid them, in a Suchimukha (needle) array. Dhrishtadyumna sees his preceptor advance towards him. Drona cuts off his bow two times and slays his steeds and charioteer, causing their army to tremble in their very sight. Duryodhana and his brothers face Bhima. Bhima faces Duryodhana and makes the Kaurava brothers flee. Abhimanyu, accompanied by Bhima and Dhrishtadyumna, pursues them; and a dreadful conflict takes place between those mighty combatants. Abhimanyu pierces Vikarna and slays his steeds. Bhima faces Duryodhana and partially destroys his car. Jayadratha with his army comes to help Duryodhana. Kripa mounts Duryodhana on his car. Jayadratha with his army battles Bhima. Abhimanyu comes with his troops to battle the Kaurava brothers. Abhimanyu destroys Vikarna's car and injures him. Beholding Vikarna pierced, his other brothers rush against Abhimanyu and his troops and a terrible battle occurs there between both sides. Bhishma spends his day slaughtering Panchala's army. At last, both sides withdraw their troops and retire.

7th day of war

Duryodhana talks with Bhishma before the day's battle. Bhishma gives him a herb for healing his wounds from the previous day. Bhishma arrays his troops in the formation called Mandala. Beholding an exceedingly fierce enemy array, King Yudhishthira disposes his troops in the array called Vajra. Thousands of kings surround Arjuna for battle. Arjuna excited with wrath, invokes the Aindra weapon, wounding those kings. Drona battles Virata and destroys his car. Virata mounts his son's Sankha's car, and battles Drona with his son. The mighty son of Bhardwaja, excited with wrath, strikes Sankha with an arrow, felling him. Beholding his son slain, Virata flees from fear, avoiding Drona in battle. Shikhandi battles Ashvatthama, who, excited in wrath, overthrows Shikhandi's chariot. Shikhandi, taking scimitar and shield, moves towards him on ground. The son of Drona destroys his weapons and pierces him with winged arrows. Shikhandi, exceedingly afflicted by those arrows, flees by mounting Satyaki's car. Satyaki battles cruel Rakshasha Alamvusha. He cuts off Satyaki's bow and pierces him, by using the power of illusion. Satyaki invokes the Aindra weapon in the air, which he had obtained from his preceptor Arjuna, which destroys demoniacal illusion, and afflicts Alamvusha, making him flee in fear.

Dhrishtadyumna battles the royal son Duryodhana, and, excited with wrath, cuts off his bow, slays his steeds, and pierces him. That mighty-armed warrior runs on foot, with a sabre, towards the son of Prishata. Sakuni mounts him on his car. Kritavarma battles Bhima, for getting his car destroyed and body mangled by the latter. His army comes to cover him. Ghatotkacha, on his car, rushes against Bhagadatta, who was stationed on his elephant. Bhagadatta slays his four steeds and repulses all his efforts before mangling him. The son of Hidimba flees from fear. Shalya engages in battle with his sister's sons, the twins. Shalya dispatches four steeds of Nakula to the abode of Yama. Nakula mounts his brother's car. Sahadeva, excited with wrath, shoots a shaft, which deeply pierces the king, making him swoon away. His charioteer bears him away over the field. The twins blow their conches joyfully after vanquishing their maternal uncle in battle.

Three Kaurava brothers engage Abhimanyu. In that fierce battle, Abhimanyu deprives them of their car but does not slay them, remembering Bhima's words. Arjuna battles and vanquishes the Susarman army. The ruler of Trigartas comes to aid Susarman. Shikhandi comes to aid Arjuna. Arjuna, avoiding Duryodhana and Jayadratha, proceeds towards the son of Ganga. Yudhishthira, avoiding Shalya, proceeds towards Bhishma, accompanied by Bhima and twins. The high-souled son of Ganga and Santanu battles all the sons of Pandu united together, wavering not at all. Jayadratha breaks their bows. Bhishma cuts off Shikhandi's bow. Shikhandi flees. Yudhishthira in anger criticizes him for such cowardice, and Sikahandin returns after hearing his harsh words. Shalya resists Shikhandi's advance and employs fiery weapons that Shikhandi baffles using the Varuna weapon. Bhishma cuts off the bow of Yudhishthira and damages his car. Until then, Jayadratha with Kuru brothers battles Bhima and pierces him. But disregarding those arrows, Vrikodara destroys his car and comes down on foot to destroy more cars with his mace. Bhishma then slays the steeds of the Pandu prince and Yudhishthira quickly mounts Nakula's car. Yudhishthira orders rulers to surround Bhishma, for his destruction, and Bhishma fells the heads of those who attack him. Shikhandi rushes towards Bhishma for battle, but Bhishma, disregarding him, proceeds to another side. Dhrishtadyumna and Satyaki afflict Bhishma's host. A group attacks Dhrishtadyumna and slays his steeds. Dhrishtadyumna quickly mounts Satyaki's car. King Yudhishthira, supported by a large force, proceed against those foes for rescue. Drona, consumes the Panchalas army for sport. At sunset, both sides, proceed towards their tents.

8th day of war

Having passed the night, the rulers once more proceed to battle. Kaurava forms the ocean array. Yudhishthira orders Prishata's son to form the Sringataka array against hostile arrays. Bhishma scorches and grinds every side, excited with rage. Dharma's son sends troops under Bhima against the son of Ganga. Bhishma slaughters all of them with his weapon, save the mighty Bhima. Bhima battles Bhishma, who is protected by Duryodhana and his brothers. Bhima slays Bhishma's charioteer, making his car run on field uncontrollably. Bhima slays 8 more brothers of Duryodhana, making other the sons flee, except Duryodhana, who then goes to Bhishma in grief, to talk. Dharma's son sends a large army—with Dhrishtadyumna, Shikhandi, Satyaki, Drupada, and Virata among them—against Bhishma alone, from the desire to slay him. Drona slaughters a large part of the army from here; and Bhima, excited with wrath, causes a terrible carnage among the Kauravas and their elephant divisions. Nakula and Sahadeva fall upon the Kaurava cavalry. In this battle, Arjuna kills a great number of kings. Iravat (Naga), Arjuna's son, joins the fight and destroys enemy forces. Duryodhana sends Alamvusha for the son of Arjuna. Alamvusha displays his power of illusion and creates 2,000 terribly-armed Rakshasa to advance against Iravan. Iravan sends them to the regions of Yama and fights with difficulty against him, and with his sword cuts off his bow. Rakshasa uses his illusion, and Iravan uses his power of changing forms, to fight and cut off his body in pieces with an axe. Rakshasa, although cut, recovers his body, and increases his size.

Iravan summons his Naga force to surround him, but Rakshasa assumes the form of Garuda and devours those snakes. When Iravan becomes confounded, he slashes Iravan's gut on the earth. Ghatotkacha comes to his side as Irawan asks him to return the head of Alambusha to Duryodhana and Iravan breathes his last. Ghatotkacha and Alambusha engage in a fierce duel. Bhishma, slaying the Pandavas army, causes them to tremble; and Drona, too, afflicts enemy forces, making Arjuna wonder. King Duryodhana, with his army, attacks Ghatotkacha's troops. Ghatotkacha slays king elephants; and attacks Duryodhana and his four Rakshasa and injures him. Ghatotkacha gets angry, and picks a huge dart to slay him; but Bhagadatta, mounting upon an elephant, places himself before the king. Hurling that dart he fells that elephant. Hearing the elephant roar, Bhishma sends a large army—with Jayadratha, Bhurisravas, Shalya, Ashvatthama, and Vikarna among it—to aid them. Ghatotkacha overwhelms them all, making them tremble. All attack him, covering him with a shower of arrows. Deeply pierced, he soars up into the sky and utters loud roar. Yudhishthira sends Bhima—with Abhimanyu, the sons of Draupadi, and other troops—to rescue him. Half the warriors fled after just looking at Bhima. King Duryodhana, excited with wrath, rushes towards Bhima, cuts off his bow, and, seeing an opportunity, deeply pierces him, injuring him. Ghatotkacha and Abhimanyu come to fight Duryodhana. Drona sends warriors—with Kripa, Bhurisravas, Shalya, Ashvatthama, and Kaurava brothers among them—to support Duryodhana. Old Drona himself pierces Bhima, but in return, is deeply pierced by Bhima, and sits down in his car. Beholding him thus pained, Ashvatthama and Duryodhana, excited with wrath, rush towards Bhima. Bhima, quickly taking up a mace, jumps down from his car and rushes towards them. All afflict Bhima, from all sides.

Abhimanyu, with his troops, comes to rescue him. Ashvatthama injures King Nila in battle. Ghatotkacha, with his kinsmen comes to battle Drona's son. Filled with wrath, he slays many Rakshasa, which enrages the giant Ghatotkacha, who uses his extraordinary powers of illusion, confounding all in that place, making them see each other cut, slain, and bathed in blood. All fly away from that place. Devavrata cries that it's just an illusion, telling them not to fly away; yet, that does not stop them, their senses having been confounded. Duryodhana talks with Bhishma about battle. Bhishma addresses Bhagadatta to fight them at his best. Bhagadatta faces the Pandavas army—with Bhima, Abhimanyu, Rakshasa Ghatotkacha, and the sons of Draupadi among them. Bhagadatta calls out his elephant, Supratika, and rushes against them. And battle begins by means of barbed arrows, muskets, and shafts. All surround, in anger, with celestial weapons, that single elephant. Bhagadatta resists all but is deeply pierced and exceedingly pained by their attack that elephant, speedily turned back, and flees, crushing Pandava ranks. Bhagadatta returns, fights with Bhima, and crushes thousands of foot-soldiers under his elephant. Ghatotkacha, assuming a terrible form, rushes towards Bhagadatta. Bhagadatta, alone, pierces all the combatants surrounding him and damages Bhima's car. Bhima, deprived of his car, jumps down, and takes up his mace. Arjuna comes there, and King Duryodhana sends an army towards Arjuna. Arjuna grieves for his slain son Iravat. Bhima faces Kaurava brothers and slays 9 more of them; others flee. Drona checks him from pursuing. Ganga's son, Bhagadatta, and Gautama resist Arjuna. The field of battle lies covered with fallen darts, swords, arrows, lances, scimitars, axes, bearded darts, iron crows, battle-axes, spiked clubs, short arrows, and rockets. As night sets in and the battle could no longer be seen, all withdraw their troops.

At night, Duryodhana consults with Sakuni, Dushasana, and Karna about battle where their generals showed mercy towards the Pandavas. Suta's son says that, let Bhishma withdraw from the fight and lay aside his weapons, he will slay Partha along with his army, in the very sight of Bhishma. Duryodhana and Dushasana go to Bhishma and ask him either slay the brave sons of Pandu or permit Karna to fight, as he will vanquish the Pandava in battle. Bhishma says that next day he will fight a fierce and famed battle.

9th day of war

The next day, Bhishma disposes his troops in an array called Sarvatobhadra (square). Abhimanyu afflicts and routs a large army, frightening them. Duryodhana sends Alamvusha. Alamvusha slaughters and routs a host of the Pandavas, and the Pandava army flees away in panic. He meets the sons of Draupadi and battles against them. They pierce Alamvusha, rendering him senseless; but regaining consciousness and excited with wrath, he cuts off their weapons, destroys their cars, and pierces each of them deeply. Beholding them afflicted, the son of Arjuna rushes at him. Both pierce each other, but Abhimanyu pushes him back.

Then Rakshasa, exhibiting his great powers of illusion, causes a thick darkness to set in, dimming visibility. Abhimanyu however, invokes into existence the blazing solar weapon, making everything visible once more, neutralizing the illusion. He conjures other diverse illusions, but the son of Arjuna neutralizes them all with his magical weapons. Rakshasa seeing his illusion destroyed and himself struck, flees in great fear. Bhishma battles hadra's son. Satyaki rushes in battle towards Drona's son, who cuts his bow in twain. Satyaki, taking up another bow, pierces him, making him sit on his car. Drona's son later damages his car. Drona comes there but Arjuna meets him in battle. Duryodhana dispatches an army to aid Drona. Arjuna engages them and shoots the Vayavya weapon against their division, causing a wind to arise that destroys their cars. Beholding the fierce Vayavya weapon, Drona shoots the Saila weapon, abating the wind. Bhagadatta surrounds Bhima with an elephant division. Bhima, taking up his mace, quickly jumps down from his car, and afflicts those elephant division, seizing and breaking some of their tusks, and slaughtering some with his mace, causing the elephant division to flee with other troops. Bhishma causes great carnage. Dhrishtadyumna, Shikhandi, Virata, and Drupada come to stop him. He pierces all except Shikhandi and cuts off Drupada's bow.

Five sons of Draupadi, Satyaki, headed by Yudhishthira, with troops, come to protect them. Bhishma's troops surrounds him to protect him, and there happened a fierce general engagement between both sides. Arjuna slaughters a large host. Drona afflicts Drupada, making him retreat. Satyaki battles Bhishma; and Yudhishthira, with his troops, surrounds Bhishma. Again a fierce battle commences. Duryodhana sends Dushasana with a large force to protect Bhishma. Bhishma pierces all surrounding him; and Drona, too, pierces his foes. Surrounded on all sides, yet unvanquished, Bhishma slaughters his foes. Afflicted by the shafts of Bhishma, all flee away. Vasudeva encourages Vibhatsu to overthrow Bhishma. Yudhishthira, with a large host, rallies, and comes again to the fight, seeing Partha proceeding for an encounter with Bhishma. Partha, with his celestial bow, twice cuts Bhishma's bow into fragments by means of his sharp shafts and is praised by Bhishma. Bhishma mangles both Partha and Vasudeva. Krishna, filled with anger and scolding Arjuna for not fighting wholeheartedly, jumps down from the car and rushes towards Bhishma, whip in hand, desirous of slaying him. Arjuna seizes Krishna and reminds him of his promise not to fight, only to drive Arjuna's chariot, or else people will call him a liar. Krishna returns, in anger, and mounts his car. Then both sides slaughter each other's army. Pandavas troops flee when they faced Bhishma, who was grinding his foes. Sunset, with withdrawal from the field.

By the end of 9th day, over 100 million have been slaughtered including many key personages of the Epic. Each night, either Duryodhana or Yudhishthira is depressed by the massive losses of their men and key generals. Embedded in the parva are treatises on war – on various ways to arrange and advance armies, various forms of attack and defense, and war logistics. The parva also describes the efforts by Pandavas and Bhishma to reach a negotiated peace, even while the war was in progress. These efforts fail.

The Pandavas lose faith in peace and discuss ways to kill Bhishma – the commander-in-chief of the Kauravas. Krishna says he will slay Bhishma in battle, if they ask. Yudhishthira refuses, for his own glorification, to falsify his words; but he wishes to slay him, the sire of his sire. When they cannot figure it out, they decide to ask Bhishma. They approach his tent, unarmed. Bhishma welcomes them. Yudhishthira asks after the means of his death, as he is the obstacle to their victory. Bhishma said, that as long he is alive, victory cannot be theirs in battle, and with weapons, he is difficult of being killed because he had the boon of icchamrityu. Bhishma suggests that the Pandavas should place Shikhandi in front of Arjuna, as he has taken an oath to never fight anyone who was once female; they should then destroy his weapons, only then, can they kill him. All return to their tents.

10th day of war

On the 10th day, Bhishma slaughters divisions of Pandavas. Shikhandi pierces him, but he does not fight him. Arjuna comes to support Shikhandi and destroys car-warriors, who all flee away in fear. Bhishma slays more than 200,000 soldiers in battle. The mighty Dushasana, abandoning all fear, battles Arjuna and Partha, who cut off his bow, split his car; but he still resists Partha. Alamvusha resists Satyaki and wounds him. Bhagadatta comes to battle Satyaki, cutting off his bow, and Duryodhana, surrounding him with a large number of cars. Ashvatthama encounters both Old Virata and Drupada. Kripa proceeds against Sahadeva, who cuts his bow. Vikarna battles Nakula. Dhrishtadyumna battles Kritavarma. Bhimsena proceeds against Bhurisravas. Drona resists Yudhishthira, who, accompanied by a large force, was going towards Bhishma. A group attacks Bhima, who resists all, breaks Kripa's and Jayadratha's bows and destroys Jayadratha's car. Shalya afflicts Bhima's charioteer and all pierce Bhima, who does not tremble, stands still, and, filled with wrath, cuts Kritavarma's bow. Arjuna, with Shikhandi, comes thither. King Duryodhana sends Susarman, with a large force, against both.

They both fell heads of combatants by hundreds and rout the fierce host of the Kauravas. Patha cuts Shalya's bow. Drona, commanded by Duryodhana, comes to that spot. Yudhisthira meets Bhishma, who tells him to slay him as planned. Abhimanyu fights with Duryodhana who is supported by a large force. The son of Drona battles Satyaki. Bhima slaughters an elephant-division. Yudhishthira encounters Shalya. Jayadratha battles Virata. Dhrishtadyumna battles Drona, who cuts his bow. Arjuna, with Shikhandi, taking the opportunity, rushes at Bhishma. King Bhagadatta comes, but Arjuna ignores him, so he proceeds against Drupada. Arjuna disperses divisions around Bhishma, and Bhishma slays fourteen-thousand car warriors, following Arjuna. Shikhandi pierces Bhishma, but Bhishma only looks, Shikhandi, however, does not understand. Arjuna encourages Shikhandi and Devavrata to check an angry Arjuna in battle. Dushasana comes and again battles Arjuna, felling down many car warriors. Arjuna vanquishes Dushasana, but Dushasana still fights. Duryodhana sends troops against Arjuna. Vibhatsu aims diverse celestial weapons at their heads and fells them, routing them and causing them to flee. Bhishma invokes a celestial weapon at Arjuna, Shikhandi comes dashing between them, and he withdraws that fiery weapon. Shalya, Kripa, Dushasana, and Vikarna slaughter a Pandava host. Bhishma slays twenty-seven thousand soldiers more, with seven great car warriors among them. Bhishma slays Satanika.

Krishna urges Arjuna to slay Bhishma. Bhishma afflicts all the Pandava generals, and Arjuna comes to rescue them all. All pierce Bhishma; and, except for Shikhandi, he fights them all back. Arjuna cuts Bhishma's bow. Seven great car warriors from Kurus come to save him, invoking celestial weapons, at Phalguni's car; and seven great Pandava car warriors come to check them. Shikhandi pierces Bhishma and Arjuna cuts off Bhishma's bow multiple times, disarming him. Bhishma thinks that if Vishnu himself was not their protector, he could have slain all Pandavas with a single strike. His time now had come. Rishis and Vasus appear to talk with him, and no one heard the words spoken by them, save Bhishma and Sanjaya, by Vyasa's grace. Both pierce Bhishma, and he still fights; but Arjuna, placing Shikhandi to the fore, cuts Bhishma's bow two more times and damages his car. Bhishma addresses Dushasana for his bravery. Bhishma takes up a shield, but Arjuna cuts off that shield. Yudhishthira sends an army at Bhishma and the Kaurava brothers surround Bhishma. Although Bhishma was pierced in all his vital limbs, yet that day he stayed calmly in the battle. Arjuna afflicts them all, breaking their formations and all flee from battle. All attack Bhishma, surrounding him, and soon fatally injure him. That foremost of all bowmen fell down from his car, pierced all over with arrows, which kept his body from touching the ground. Loud cries were heard over there. And that hero, even with loss of blood, permitted not his senses to depart, as per his father's boon to him. The Kurus, headed by Kripa and Duryodhana, sighed and wept. All Pandavas obtaining victory, blew their conches and rejoiced. Rishis and the Pitris all applauded Bhishma with high vows.

Bhishma's bed of arrows

After the defeat of Bhishma in the evening, Bhima celebrates his victory. Dushasana informs everyone of Bhishma's fall, shocking Drona. All desist from battle and go to Bhishma, offering their salutations. Bhishma blesses everyone and asks for a pillow. Arjuna, taking up the bow Gandiva and 3 arrows, inspiring them with mantras, supports Bhishma's head. As he slips into death, surgeons rush to give him medical help, but Bhishma rebuffs all attempts. All are filled with wonder, astonished at the virtuous constancy displayed by Bhishma. The combatants return to their tents. Krishna, filled with joy at the fall of Bhishma, talks with Yudhishthira. At night, Bhishma asks for water. The valiant Arjuna, stretching his Gandiva, fires the Parjanya weapon in the very sight of entire army, which pierces the earth, bringing forth a jet of water. And beholding that feat of Vibhatsu implying superhuman prowess, all are filled with great wonder. He calls on Duryodhana and makes another appeal to stop the war and enter into peace negotiations. Duryodhana refuses. All return to their respective quarters.

== English translations ==
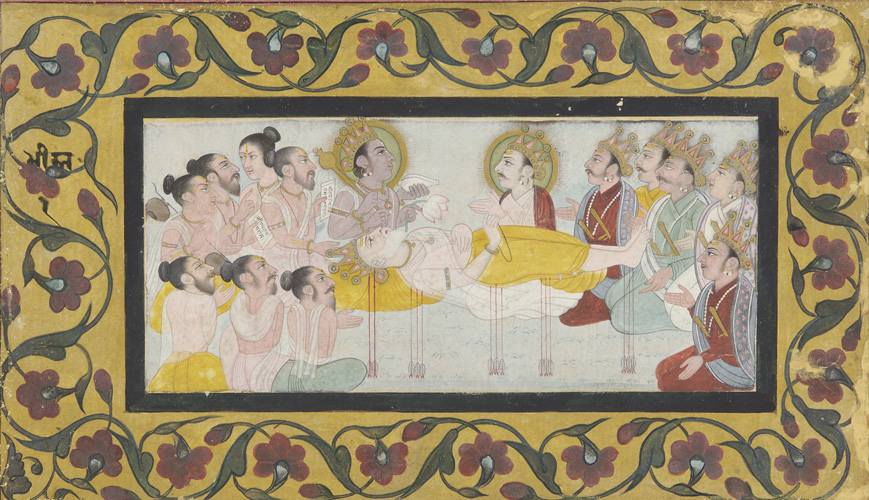
Bhishma on his deathbed of arrows. From the collection of the Smithsonian Institution

Bhishma Parva was composed in Sanskrit. Several translations of the book in English are available. Two translations from the 19th century, now in the public domain, are those by Kisari Mohan Ganguli and Manmatha Nath Dutt. The translations vary with each translator's interpretations.

The Clay Sanskrit Library has published a 15 volume set of the Mahabharata, which includes a translation of Bhishma Parva by Alex Cherniak. This translation is modern and uses an old manuscript of the Epic. The translation does not remove verses and chapters now widely believed to be spurious and smuggled into the Epic in the 1st or 2nd millennium AD.

J. A. B. van Buitenen has published an annotated edition of Bhagvadgita from Bhishma Parva, based on a critically edited and the least corrupted version of Mahabharata known in 1980. Debroy, in 2011, notes that the updated critical edition of Bhishma Parva, with so-far-known spurious and corrupted text removed, has 4 parts, 117 adhyayas (chapters) and 5,381 shlokas (verses). Debroy's translated version of the critical edition of Bhishma Parva appeared in Volume 5 of his series.

The entire parva has been "transcreated" and translated in verse by the poet Dr. Purushottama Lal published by Writers Workshop.

== Salient features ==
The Bhishma Parva has several treatises embedded in it, such as the just war theory and the Bhagavad Gita.

=== Just war theory ===
The Jamvukhanda Vinirmana sub-parva of Bhishma Parva is one of the several instances in the Mahabharata that provides an outline of just war theory in ancient India. Book 12 (Shanti Parva) is another instance of a significant discussion of just war theory and principles of proportional punishment.

Before the first day of war, the Kurus, the Pandavas, and the Somakas meet and agree on rules of war. Some examples of the agreed rules were:

1. Fairness – Every battle must be fair. Only armed and fighting soldiers can be attacked.
2. Proportional and equitable response – those who fight with words, should be fought with words; chariot warriors should fight chariot warriors, horsemen with horsemen. Weapons that cause disproportionate suffering or slaughter shall not be used.
3. An enemy soldier who surrenders should not be treated with violence, but with kindness and respect.
4. A disarmed, injured enemy should be helped, not attacked nor killed.
5. Logistical staff—such as those who play on drums or conch to announce the daily start or stop of war, or those that bring food or equipment—must not be attacked nor injured.

=== Bhagavad Gita ===
Chapters 25 through 42 of Bhishma Parva present the dialogue between Arjuna and Krishna. Arjuna sees family, friends, and good human beings on both sides of the war. He does not want to kill. Arjuna argues that gaining a kingdom with stain of blood is a tragedy. He asks Krishna, why fight? Krishna's answer is in several parts:

1. Krishna starts with a foundation of Samkhya philosophy – the mystery of knowing self. He says, one must distinguish between the real and unreal, the self that is permanent and universal from the body that is temporary and fleeting. One's action should serve the cause of the permanent self, not the temporary body. In a war motivated by just cause, virtue, and ideas, the permanent self is at stake and what one fights for.
2. Krishna next presents a summary of Yoga philosophy – the mystery of living in self, as a free and liberated person. One must be free, claims Krishna, from the pairs of opposite extremes (heat and cold, pain and pleasure, anxiety and craving). One must act for the goodness innate in that action, not because one craves the fruit of the action, or is angry, or is fearful.
3. Krishna says there are three paths to liberation, or moksha: Jnana yoga, Karma yoga, and Dhyana yoga. Jnana, he claims, is knowledge. Karma is action. Dhyana is meditation. By fighting a just war, to the best of his abilities, without craving the outcome, Arjuna would be performing Karma yoga.
4. In Chapter 29, Krishna claims pursuit of action is superior than renunciation of action, though both lead to knowledge and liberation. Chapters 31-34 discuss bhakti as the path for spiritual emancipation.

== Quotations and teachings ==
Jamvukhanda Vinirmana Parva, Chapter 3:

Men lose good judgment in things which concern their interest.

— Dhritrashtra, Bhishma Parva, Mahabharata Book vi.3.60

Jamvukhanda Vinirmana Parva, Chapter 3:

Success that is obtained by negotiations and other means is the best.
Success which is secured by creating disunion amongst the enemy is temporary.
Success secured by battle is the worst.

There are many evils in battle: the first and the foremost is slaughter.
Victory is always uncertain. It depends on chance. Even those that obtain victory have to suffer losses.

— Vyasa, Bhishma Parva, Mahabharata Book vi.3.81

Jamvukhanda Vinirmana Parva, Chapter 4:

Everything rises from the earth and when destroyed everything goes into her. The earth is the stay and the refuge of all creatures. The earth is eternal.

— Sanjaya, Bhishma Parva, Mahabharata Book vi.4.20

Jamvukhanda Vinirmana Parva, Chapter 9:

If the resources of the earth are properly developed, she is then like an all-yielding cow, from which the threefold objects of Dharma, Artha and Kama might be milked. With the desire of enjoying the earth, men have become like dogs that snatch meat from one another.

— Sanjaya, Bhishma Parva, Mahabharata Book vi.9.71-74

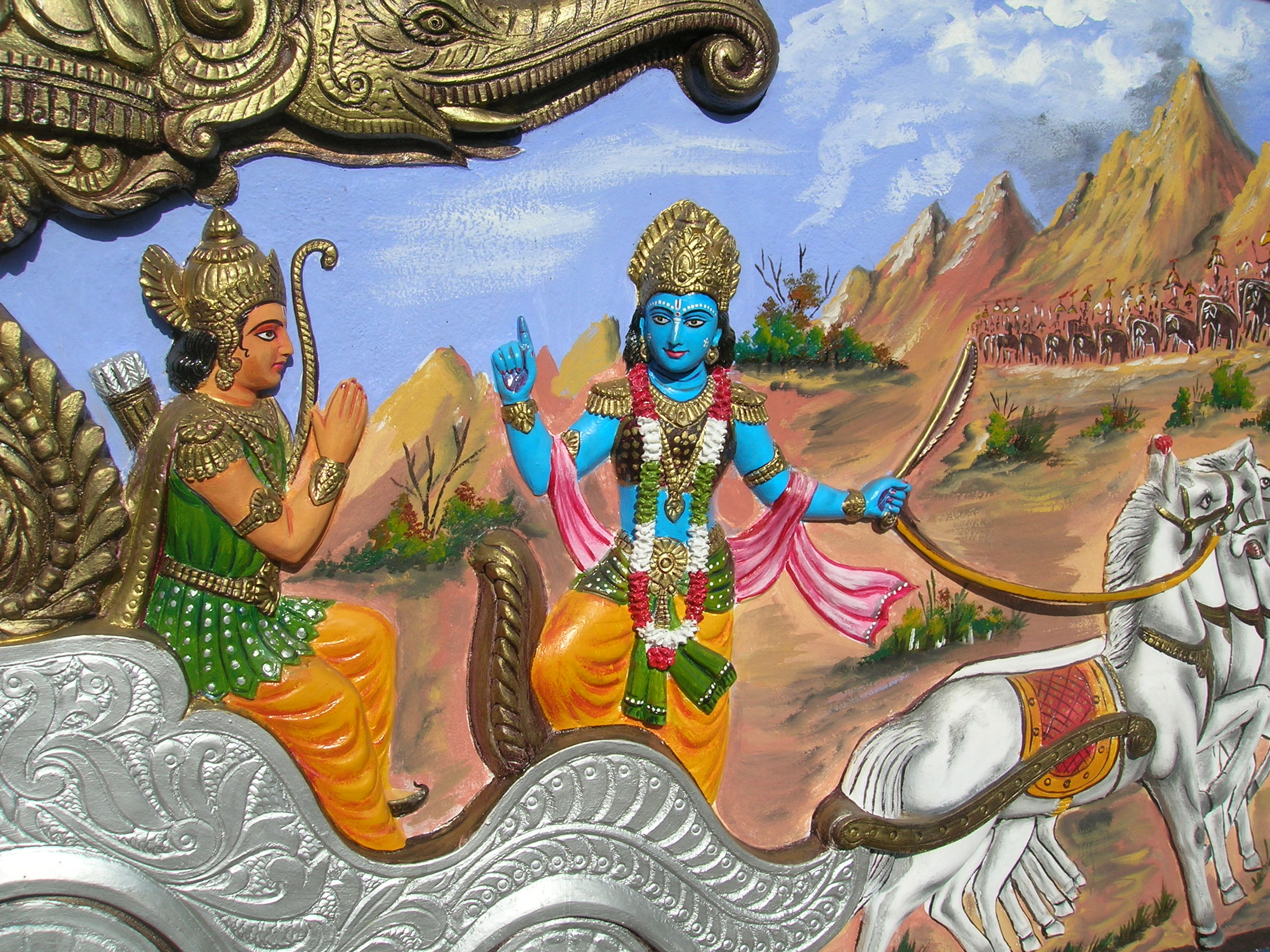
Krishna explains to Arjuna why a just war must be fought, nature of life, and the paths to moksa. This treatise is present in Bhishma Parva, and known as Bhagavad Gita.

Bhagavat Gita Parva, Chapter 15:

The man who suffers evil for his own misconduct should not attribute it to others.

— Sanjaya, Bhishma Parva, Mahabharata Book vi.15.2

Bhagavat Gita Parva, Chapter 21:

They that are desirous of victory do not so much conquer by might and prowess, as by truth, compassion, piety and virtue. Fight without any arrogance, for victory is certain to be there where righteousness is.

— Sanjaya, Bhishma Parva, Mahabharata Book vi.21.10-11

Bhagavat Gita Parva, Chapter 26:

It is better for one to live on alms than to kill.

— Sanjaya, Bhishma Parva, Mahabharata Book vi.26.5

Bhagavat Gita Parva, Chapter 26:

One sees it as a wonder, another speaks of it as a wonder, others again hear of it as a wonder; but even hearing of it, no one understands it. This indestructible embodied self, O Bharata, is in the bodies of everyone.

— Sanjaya, Bhishma Parva, Mahabharata Book vi.26.29-30

Bhagavat Gita Parva, Chapter 26:

The self-controlled man attains peace.
Peace destroys all miseries. A mind that has attained peace becomes steady.
The man, who casts off all desires, is free from attachments, from cravings for things and pride attains peace.

— Sanjaya, Bhishma Parva, Mahabharata Book vi.26.64-71

Bhagavat Gita Parva, Chapter 40:

Fearlessness, purity of heart, perseverance, yoga meditation, charity, self-restraint, study of the Vedas, uprightness,
ahimsa, truth, freedom from anger, freedom from fault finding in others, renunciation, tranquility, compassion, absence of covetousness,
gentleness, modesty, vigor, forgiveness, firmness, cleanliness, absence of quarrelsomeness, freedom from vanity,
O Bharata, all these belong to him who is god-like.

— Krishna, Bhishma Parva, Mahabharata Book vi.40.1-3

== See also ==
- Previous book of Mahabharata: Udyoga Parva
- Next book of Mahabharata: Drona Parva
