= Magha (month) =

Eleventh month of the Hindu lunar calendar

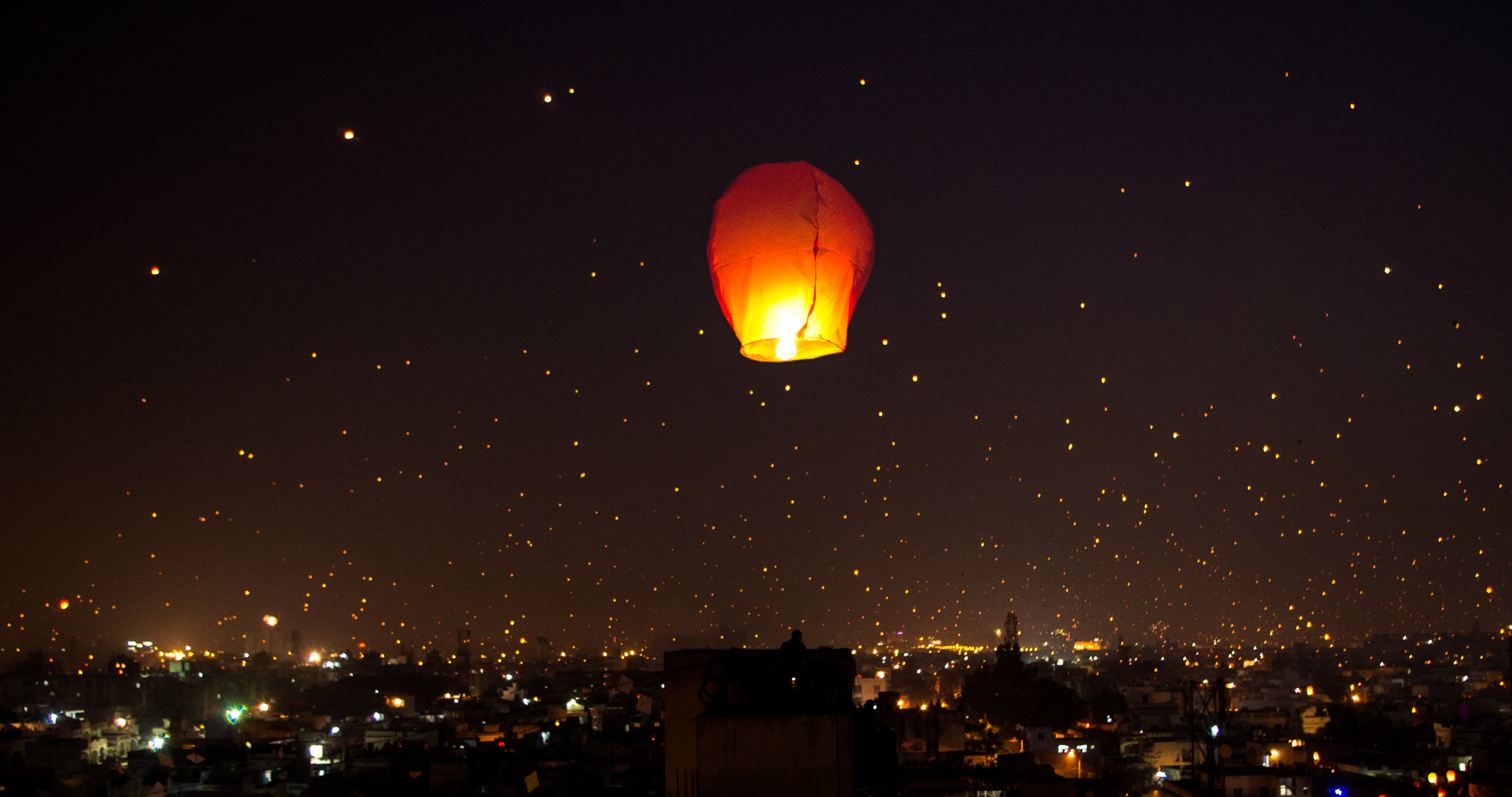
- Sky lit up with lights and kites during Makar Sankranti, a major Hindu harvest festival
- Native name: माघ (Sanskrit)
- Calendar: Hindu calendar
- Month number: 11
- Number of days: 29 or 30
- Season: Shishira (Winter)
- Gregorian equivalent: January–February
- Significant days: Bhishma Ashtami; Makar Sankranti; Ratha Saptami; Vasant Panchami

Magha (Māgha) is the eleventh month of the Hindu lunar calendar and the Indian national calendar. The name of the month is derived from the position of the Moon near the Magha nakshatra (star) on the full moon day. The month marks the winter (Shishira) season and falls in January–February of the Gregorian calendar.

In the Hindu solar calendar, it corresponds to the month of Makara and begins with the Sun's entry into Capricorn. It corresponds to Magh, the tenth month in the Bengali calendar. In the Tamil calendar, it corresponds to the eleventh month of Masi, falling in the Gregorian months of February–March. In the Vaishnav calendar, it corresponds to the eleventh month of Madhava.

In the Hindu lunar calendar, each month has 29 or 30 days. The month begins on the next day after Amavasya (new moon) or Purnima (full moon) as per amanta and purnimanta systems respectively. A month consists of two cycles of 15 days each, Shukla Paksha (waxing moon) and Krishna Paksha (waning moon). Days in each cycle is labeled as a thithi, with each thithi repeating twice in a month.

== Festivals ==
=== Bhishma Ashtami ===
Bhishma Ashtami is observed on the Ashtami (eighth lunar day) thithi of Shukla Paksha (waxing moon) of the month. It commemorates the death anniversary of Bhishma, one of the central characters from the Hindu epic Mahabharata, who chose his time of death during the auspicious Uttarayana period. On the day, people perform rituals at river banks to honour him and their ancestors.

=== Makar Sankranti ===
Makar Sankranti is a harvest festival that marks the transition of the Sun to Capricorn (Makara), beginning its northward journey (Uttarayana). People celebrate the festival by thanking the Sun and nature for a good harvest. Rituals including river bathing, preparation of sweets, kite flying, and social activities.

=== Ratha Saptami ===
Ratha Saptami falls on Saptami (seventh lunar day) of Shukla Paksha, and is dedicated to the Sun god Surya. As per Hindu mythology, it marks the day when Surya rides his chariot (ratha) drawn by seven horses, and marks the coming of spring. People bathe early in the morning and offer prayers to the Sun for prosperity and health.

=== Vasant Panchami ===
Vasant Panchami is celebrated on Panchami (fifth lunar day) thithi of Shukla Paksha. The festival marks the end of winter and welcomes the impending arrival of spring season (Vasanta). It is dedicated to the worship of goddess Saraswati, the patron deity of knowledge, learning and arts. People wear bright coloured clothes, symbolising the onset of spring, and often fly kites.

=== Magha Purnima ===
Magha Purnima, observed on the full Moon day, marks the start of the annual Magh Mela, and the Kumbh Mela, held once in twelve years.

== See also ==
- Astronomical basis of the Hindu calendar
- Hindu astrology
- Hindu calendar
- Indian astronomy
- Indian units of measurement
