= Vasant Panchami =

Hindu festival celebrated to welcome spring

Vasant Panchami/Saraswati Puja
- Saraswati by Raja Ravi Varma (print)
- Observed by: Hindus in India, Nepal, Bangladesh, Java and Bali (Indonesia and many other countries)
- Type: Cultural, religious
- Significance: Spring, harvest, Goddess Saraswati
- Celebrations: Worship of Goddess Saraswati
- Date: Magha Shukla Panchami
- 2026 date: 23 January (Friday)
- 2027 date: 11 February (Thursday)

Explanatory note on Hindu festival dates
- The Hindu calendar is lunisolar but most festival dates are specified using the lunar portion of the calendar. A lunar day is uniquely identified by three calendar elements: māsa (lunar month), pakṣa (lunar fortnight) and tithi (lunar day). Furthermore, when specifying the masa, one of two traditions are applicable, viz. amānta / pūrṇimānta. If a festival falls in the waning phase of the moon, these two traditions identify the same lunar day as falling in two different (but successive) masa. A lunar year is shorter than a solar year by about eleven days. As a result, most Hindu festivals occur on different days in successive years on the Gregorian calendar.

Vasant Panchami, also rendered Basant Panchami and Saraswati Puja in honour of the Hindu goddess Saraswati, is a Hindu festival that marks the preparation for the arrival of spring. It is celebrated during the fifth day (Panchami) in the bright fortnight (Shukla Paksha) of the month of Magha between January and February every year of the Hindu lunar year.

Vasant Panchami also marks the start of preparation for Holika and Holi, which take place forty days later. The Vasant Utsava (festival) on Panchami is celebrated forty days before spring, because any season's transition period is 40 days, and after that, the season comes into full bloom.

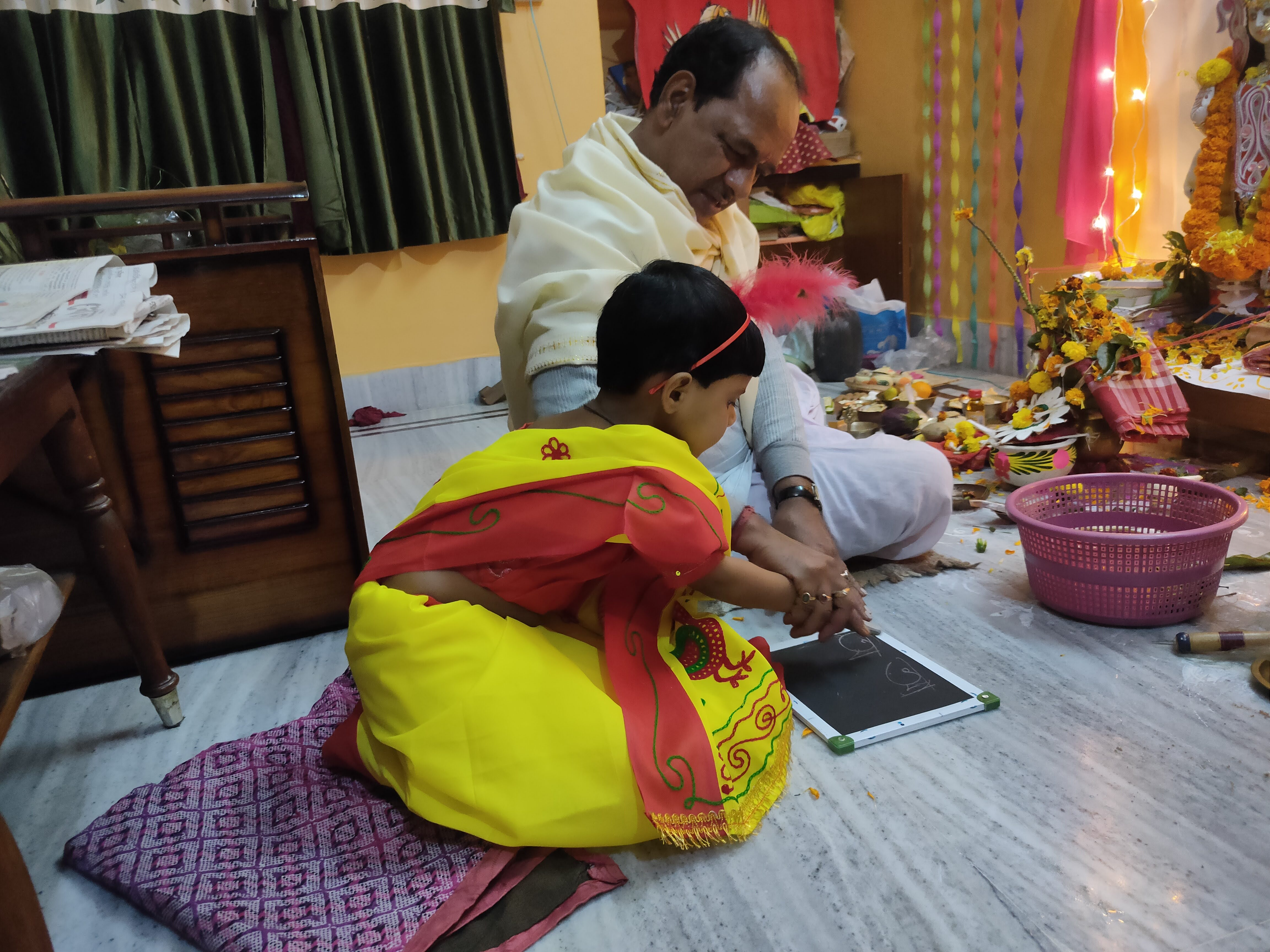
Haate Khori is considered to be a holy start to a child's journey of education.

== Nomenclature and date ==
Vasant Panchami is celebrated every year on the fifth day of the bright half of the Hindu lunisolar calendar month of Magha, which typically falls in late January or February. Spring is known as the "King of all Seasons", so the festival commences forty days in advance. On Vasant Panchami, the weather is generally winter-like in northern India and more spring-like in central and western regions, supporting the belief that spring reaches its peak forty days after the festival.

The festival is particularly observed by Hindus in the Indian subcontinent, notably India and Nepal. In southern states, the same day is called Sri Panchami.

On the island of Bali and the Hindus of Indonesia, it is known as "Hari Raya Saraswati" (great day of Saraswati). It also marks the ending of the 210-day long Balinese Pawukon calendar.

== Hinduism ==
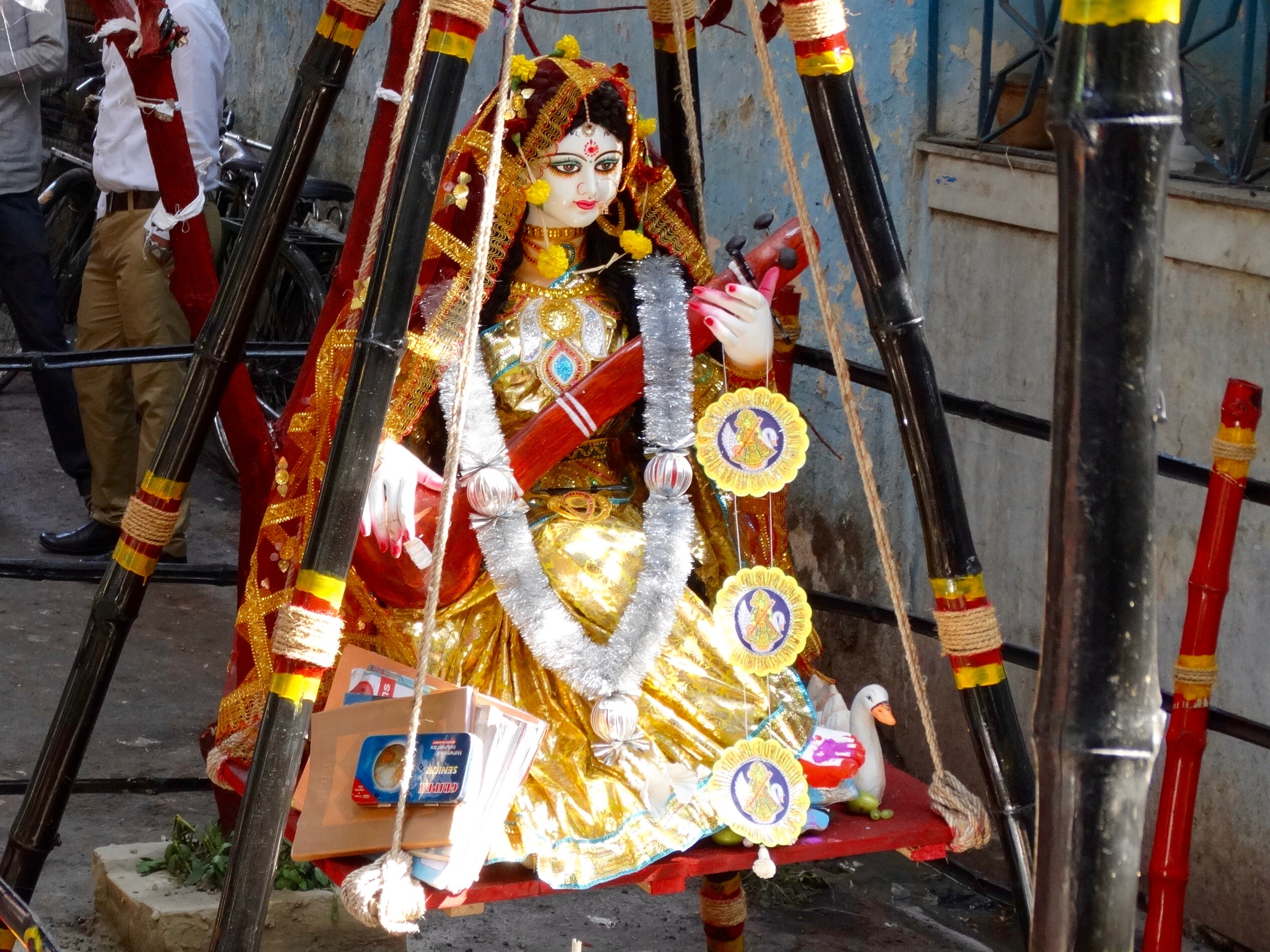
Goddess Saraswati dressed in a yellow sari on Vasant Panchami, Kolkata. She sits in a swing, holding a Veena, with books in one corner.

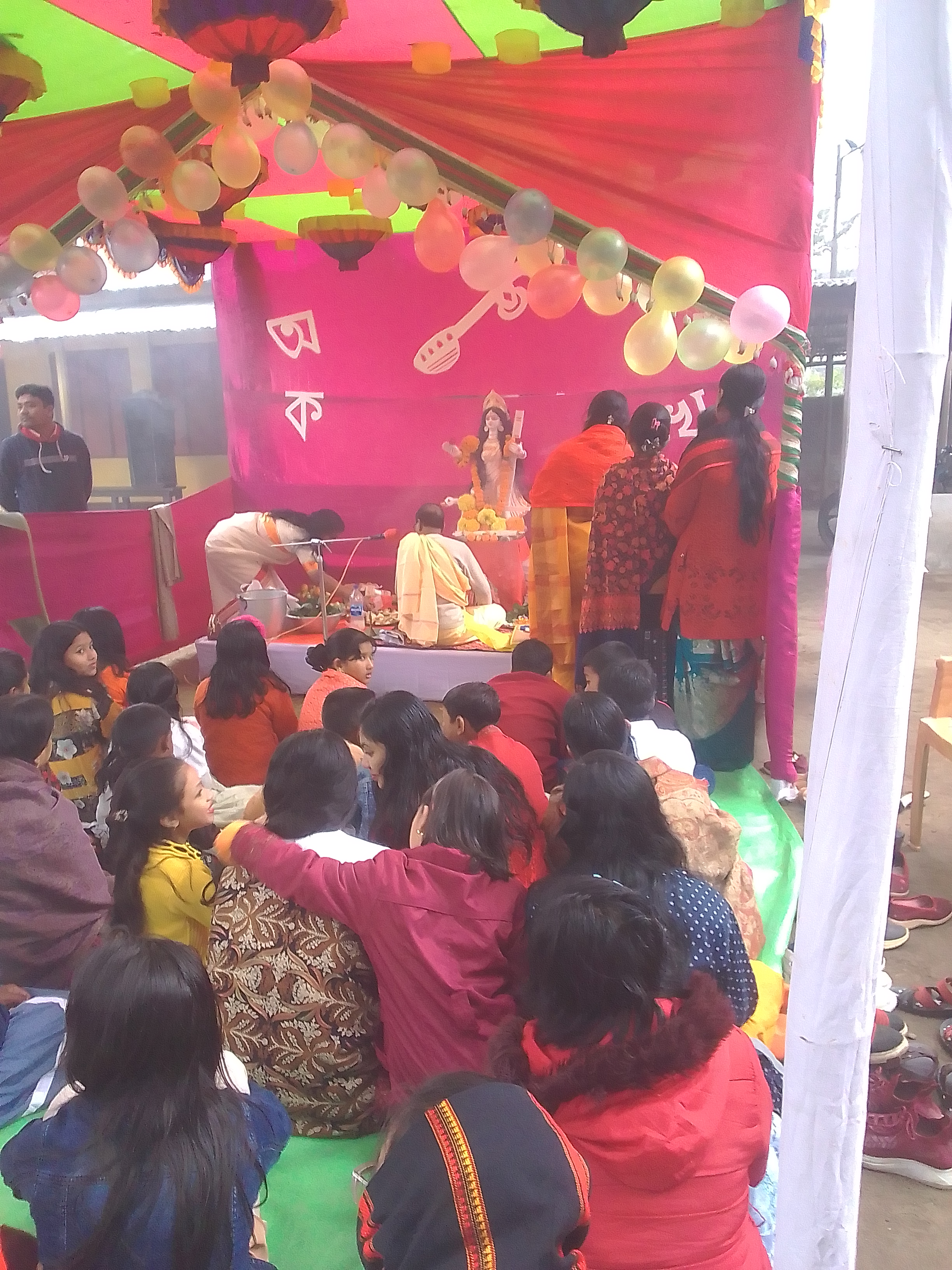
Saraswati Puja being celebrated in Collectorate Public School And College, Thakurgaon, Bangladesh

=== Saraswati Puja ===
Vasant Panchami is a Hindu festival that marks the beginning of preparations for the spring season. Celebrations vary by region. Vasant Panchami also marks the start of preparation for Holika or Holi, which occur forty days later. For many, Vasant Panchami is dedicated to goddess Saraswati, revered as the deity of knowledge, language, music, and all arts. She symbolizes creative energy and power in all its forms, including longing and love. The season and festival also celebrate the blooming of yellow mustard flowers, which are linked with Saraswati's favorite color. People wear yellow clothing or accessories, and eat yellow-colored foods.

Many families mark this day by encouraging their young children to write their first words, and study or create music together. The day before Vasant Panchami, Saraswati's temples are filled with food so that she can join the celebrants in the traditional feasting the following morning. In temples and educational institutions, murtis of Saraswati are dressed in yellow and worshiped. Many educational institutions arrange special prayers or pujas in the morning to seek her blessings. Poetic and musical gatherings are held in some communities in her honor.

In Northen and Eastern India, primarily in Uttar Pradesh, West Bengal, Assam, Tripura, Bihar, Rajashthan, Punjab, Haryana, as well as in Nepal, devotees visit Saraswati temples and also worship Goddess Saraswati at home (Saraswati Puja). In Northern and Eastern India the festival is widely celebrated by Hindus; most schools arrange Saraswati puja for their students on their premises. In West Bengal, Saraswati Pujo name is primarily used whereas in Northen India Basant Panchami name is mainly used.The day has come to be associated with couples spending time together dressed in traditional kurtas/pajama and saris. .

In the states of Northern India, the festival is celebrated as Basanta Panchami, Sri Panchami, or Saraswati Puja. Homas and yagnas are performed in schools and colleges across the state. Usually, children aged four or five begin their formal education, known as Khadi-Chuan or Vidya-Arambha. This is alternatively known as Haate-Khori among Bengali Hindus.

An Odia song for Sripanchami (Vasant Panchami)

In southern states such as Andhra Pradesh, the festival is known as Sri Panchami where "Sri" refers to Saraswati as a manifestation of goddess Devi.

=== Other deities ===
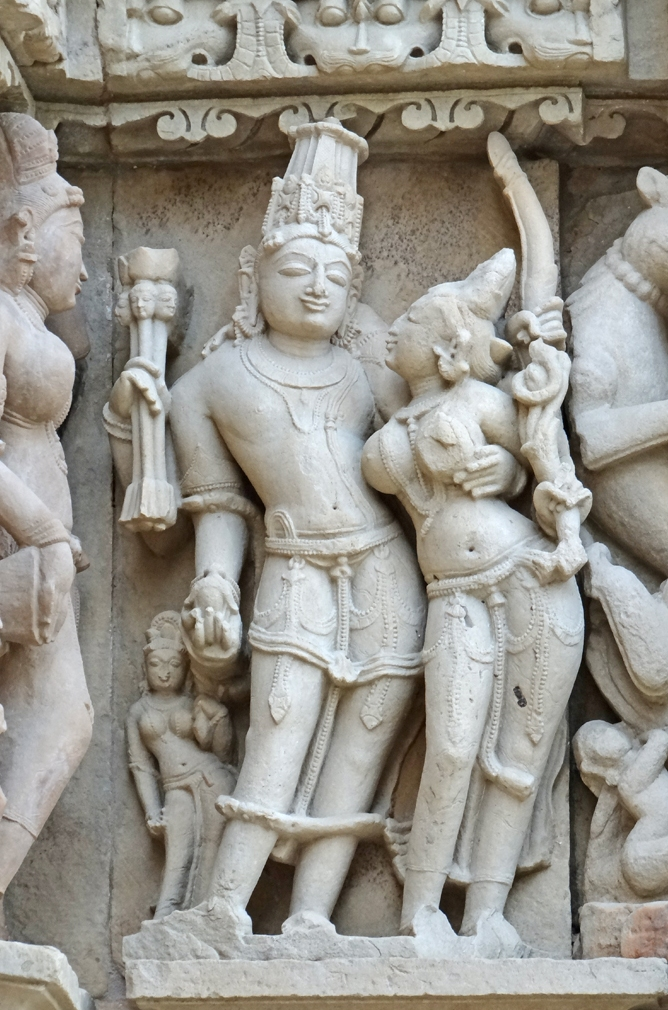
Vasant Panchami, in some places, celebrates the Hindu god of love Kama (left) with Rati, shown above at the Khajuraho temple.

Vasant Panchami is also associated with Kamadeva, the god of love. Kamadeva is reborn as Pradyumna, the son of Krishna and Rukmini. The festival is also known as "Madana Panchami". He awakens the passions of the earth (and its people) and thus the world blooms anew.

It is remembered as the day when rishis (sages) requested Kama to interrupt Shiva's yogic meditation. Supporting Parvati–who was performing penance to gain Shiva as her husband–the rishis seek Kama's help to arouse Shiva's worldly desires. Kama agrees and shoots an arrow, made of flowers and bees, to stir Shiva's desires. When Shiva awakens from his meditation, he opens his third eye, and Kama is burned to ashes. This initiative is celebrated by Hindus as Vasant Panchami.

Vasant Panchami is associated with the emotions of love and emotional anticipation in Kutch (Gujarat) and is celebrated by preparing bouquets and garlands of flowers set with mango leaves, as a gift. People dress in saffron, pink, or yellow and visit each other. Songs about Krishna's pranks with Radha, considered to mirror Kama-Rati, are sung. This is symbolized with the Hindu deity Kama with his wife Rati.

Traditionally, in Maharashtra, Madhya Pradesh, Chhattisgarh, and Uttar Pradesh, after bathing in the morning, people worship Shiva and Parvati. Offerings of mango flowers and the ears of wheat are traditionally made.

=== Deo temple: Sun God ===
The shrine of the Sun God in Aurangabad district, Bihar known as the Deo-Sun Shrine, was established on Basant Panchami. The day is celebrated to commemorate the founding of the shrine by King Aila of Allahabad and the birthday of the Sun-Deo God. The statues are washed and old red clothes on them are replaced with new ones on Basant Panchami. Devotees sing, dance and play musical instruments.

=== Other ===
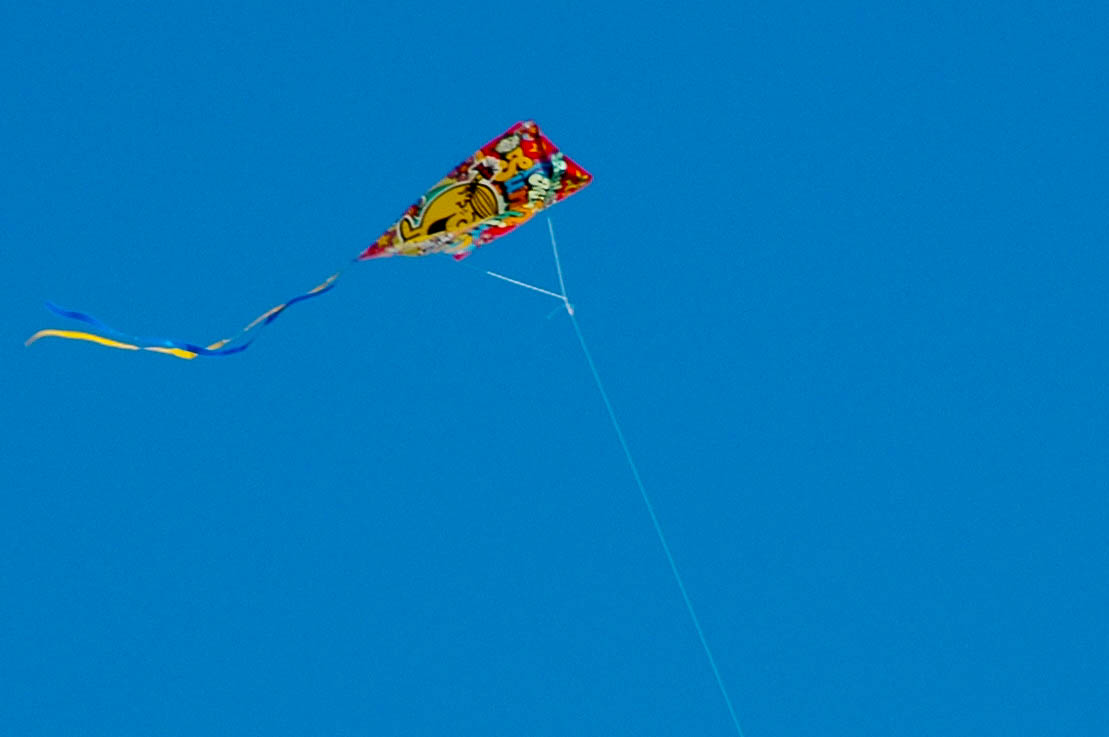
A kite flying during Basant Panchami celebrations. The practice of flying kites in a religious context can be traced to at least the 13th century, with references to paper-made kites in the devotional poems of the Marathi saint Namdev. Kite flying is also traditional in west India on Uttarayan, in Mathura on Viskwakarma Puja and in south India.

People celebrate the day by wearing yellow (white), eating sweet dishes and displaying yellow flowers in homes. In Rajasthan, it is customary for people to wear jasmine garlands. In Maharashtra, newly married couples visit a temple and offer prayers on the first Basant Panchami after the wedding, wearing yellow dresses. In the Punjab region, Hindus wear a yellow turban or headdress. In Uttarakhand, in addition to Saraswati Puja, people worship Shiva, Parvati as the mother earth and the crops or agriculture. People eat yellow rice and wear yellow. It is also a significant school supplies shopping and related gift-giving season. In Gujarat, Vasant Panchami is regarded as an auspicious date for wedding, housewarming, and starting a new business.

In the Punjab region, Basant is celebrated as a seasonal festival by all faiths and is known as the Basant Festival of Kites. Children buy dor (thread) and guddi or patang (kites) for the sport. The people of the Punjab wear yellow clothes and eat yellow rice to emulate the yellow mustard (sarson) flower fields, or play by flying kites. According to Desai (2010), the tradition of flying kites on various festivals is also found in northern and western Indian states: Hindus in Rajasthan and especially in Gujarat associate kite flying with the period prior to Uttarayan; in Mathura (Uttar Pradesh), kites are flown on Dussehra; in Bengal kite flying takes place on Viskwakarma Puja in September. The sport is also found in Maharashtra, Madhya Pradesh and parts of south India.

On Bali and among Indonesian Hindus, Hari Raya Saraswati (the festival's local name) is celebrated with prayers in family compounds, educational institutions, and public venues from morning to noon. Teachers and students wear brightly coloured clothes instead of their usual uniforms, and children bring traditional cakes and fruit to school for offerings in a temple.

== Sikhism ==
Namdhari Sikhs have historically celebrated Basant Panchami to mark the beginning of spring. Other Sikhs treat it as a spring festival, and joyfully celebrate it by wearing yellow colored clothes, emulating the bright yellow mustard flowers in the fields.

Maharaja Ranjit Singh, the founder of the Sikh Empire, encouraged the celebration of Basant Panchami as a social event in the Gurdwaras. In 1825 CE he gave 2,000 rupees to the Harmandir Sahib Gurdwara in Amritsar to distribute food. He held an annual Basant fair and sponsored kite flying as a regular feature of the fairs. Maharaja Ranjit Singh and his queen Moran would dress in yellow and fly kites on Basant Panchami. Maharaja Ranjit Singh would also hold a darbar or court in Lahore on Basant Panchami which lasted ten days when soldiers would dress in yellow and show their military prowess.

In the Malwa region, the festival of Basant Panchami is celebrated with wearing of yellow dress and kite flying. In Kapurthala and Hoshiarpur, a Basant Panchami fair is held. People attend the fair wearing yellow clothes, turbans or accessories. Sikhs also remember the martyrdom of the child Haqiqat Rai on Basant Panchmi, who was arrested by the Muslim ruler Khan Zakariya Khan after being falsely accused of insulting Islam. Rai was given the choice of converting to Islam or death and, having refused conversion, was executed on the Basant Panchami of 1741 in Lahore, Pakistan.

Nihangs go to Patiala on Basant Panchami and dress in pink and yellow on the month of Vaisakh (not only Basant Panchami day).

== Islam ==
According to Lochan Singh Buxi, Basant Panchmi is a Hindu festival adopted by some Indian Muslim Sufis in the 12th century to mark the grave of the Muslim Sufi saint dargah of Nizamuddin Aulia in Delhi and ever since, has been observed by the Chishti order. According to local Sufi traditions, the poet Amir Khusrau saw Hindu women carry yellow flowers to a temple on Basant and they were dressed in yellow, and he adopted their culture to give some happiness to Nizamuddin Aulia because his nephew died few days ago and he was not recovering from grief, one the Chishti order of Sufi Indian Muslims continue to practice.

== Pakistan ==
Given the shared history and culture in the Indian subcontinent, the Punjabi Muslims in and around Lahore also celebrate kite flying as a sport in Pakistan from home rooftops during the Basant season. In 2007, the Supreme Court of Pakistan imposed a ban on the manufacture, trade, and flying of kites in Lahore on the basis of fatal incidents due to glass-coated stray strings used in the kites in Lahore. Plans to restore the festival in 2013 were cancelled after Jamaat-ud-Dawa threatened attacks on the celebrations, claiming the festival had "Hindu origins" and describing it as "un-Islamic." In 2017, the ban on Basant was briefly lifted and reimposed. The ban was lifted in 2026 (now referred as Basant festival) after 19 years.

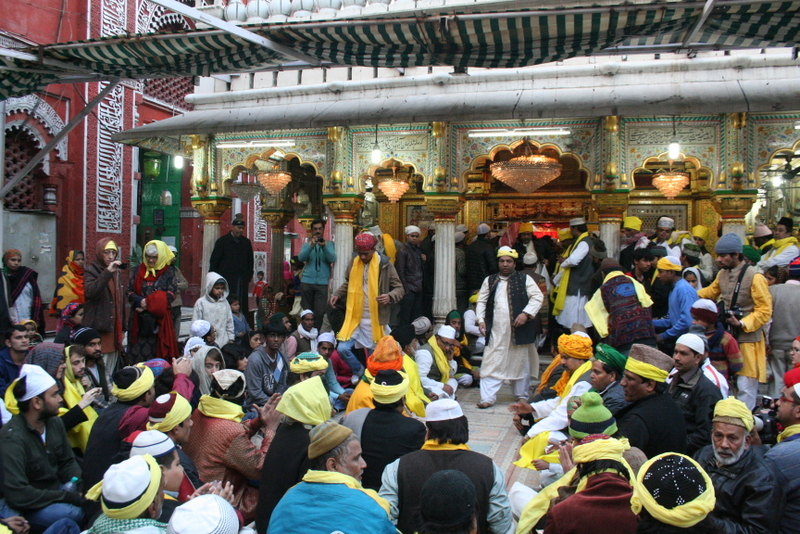
Basant Celebrations at the Dargah

== Controversy ==
Vasant Panchami has been a historic occasion of dispute at the archaeological site of Bhojshala (Dhar, Madhya Pradesh) with evidence of an early Saraswati temple (locally called Waghdevi). On the site of Bhojshala is a later era Kamal-Maula mosque, which Muslims use for Friday prayers. The Archeological Survey of India (ASI) has provided annual guidelines, when the Vasant Panchami festival falls on a Friday, announcing hours when Hindus can worship at Bhojshala on Vasant Panchami, and when Muslims can. However, in past years, the Muslim community scheduled earlier has refused to vacate the premises, leading to riots and disorder such as in the 1980s and 1990s.

== See also ==
- Vasanta (Ritu)
