= Bhishma =

Statesman and patriarch of the Kurus in the epic Mahabharata

- Mahabharata character
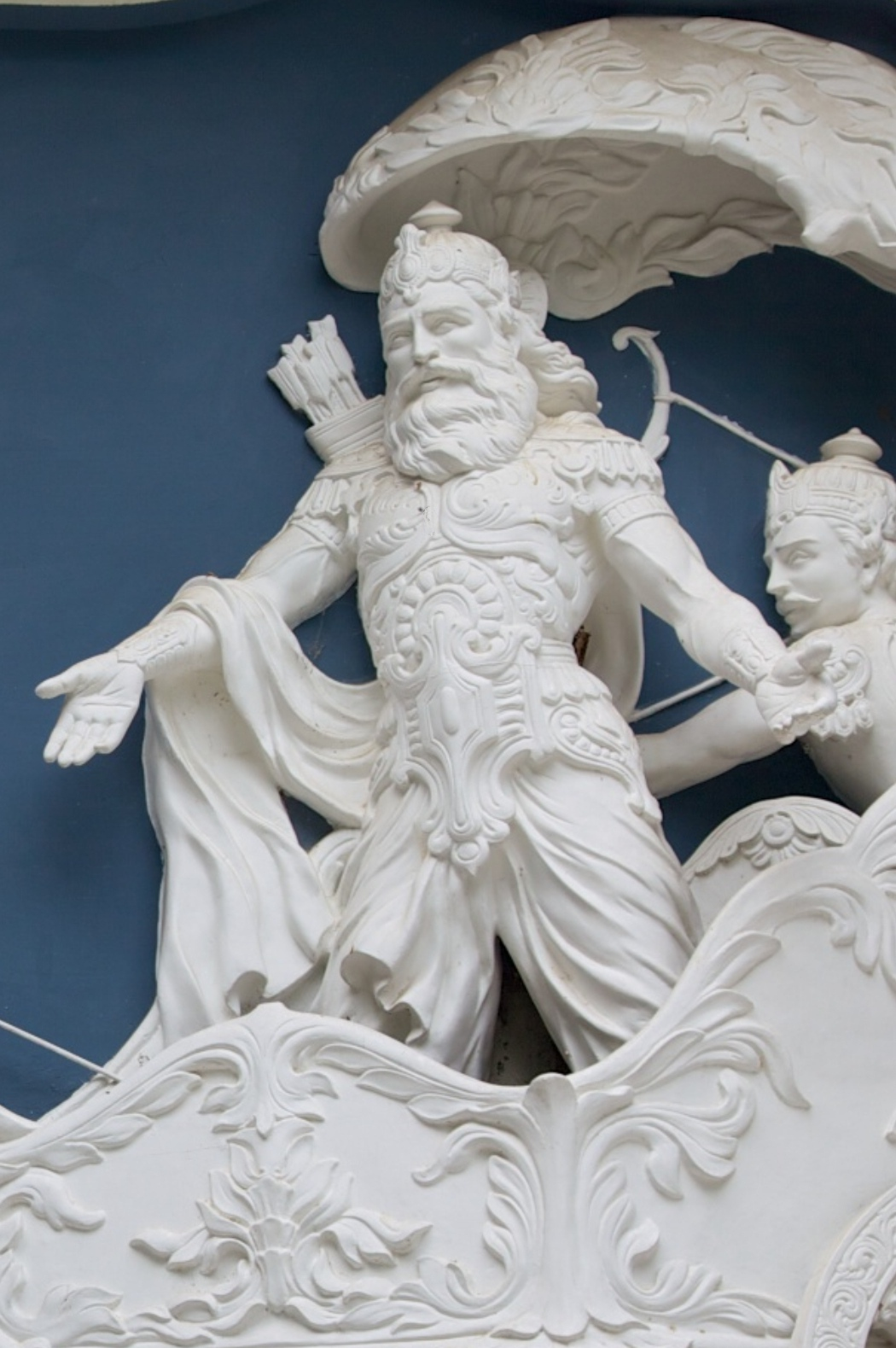
- A contemporary sculpture of Bhishma during the Kurukshetra War

Information
- Aliases: Devavrata; Gauranga; Bhishma; Pitamaha; Gangaputra; Mahamahima; Gangadatta; Kurushreshtha
- Title(s): Supreme and First Commander of the Kauravas
- Affiliation: Kauravas; Maharathi
- Weapon: Bow and arrow; Sword; Axe; Gada; Spear
- Family: Shantanu (father); Ganga (mother); Satyavati (step-mother); Chitrangada; Vichitravirya (half-brothers)
- Religion: Hinduism
- Home: Kuru Kingdom
- Dynasty: Chandravamsha

Bhishma (Sanskrit: भीष्म, romanized: Bhīṣma), also known as Pitāmaha, Gangāputra, and Devavrata, is a central figure in the Hindu epic Mahabharata. He was a statesman, divine-born hero and military commander of the ancient Kuru kingdom. Renowned for his wisdom, valor, skill in battle and unwavering principles, Bhishma served as the supreme commander of the Kaurava forces during the first ten days of the Kurukshetra War until his fall.

Born to King Shantanu and the river goddess Ganga, he was originally named Devavrata and designated the heir-apparent to the throne. However, he renounced his claim and took a vow of lifelong celibacy to facilitate his father's marriage to Satyavati. This sacrifice earned him the title Bhishma, meaning "the one who undertakes a severe vow," and he was blessed with Ichcha Mrityu—the boon of choosing his time of death.

Bhishma's life after his vow was marked by his steadfast loyalty to the Kuru dynasty and his navigation of complex political and familial challenges. He served as the chief adviser and regent to successive rulers of Hastinapura, including his half-brothers Chitrangada and Vichitravirya, as well as their successors—Pandu and Dhritarashtra. During this period, he came into conflict with his preceptor in warfare, Parashurama, over the abduction of Amba, a princess whom he had carried off for Vichitravirya’s marriage. He also played a decisive role in arranging the marriages of Pandu and Dhritarashtra, and in overseeing the upbringing of their children—the five Pandava brothers led by Yudhishthira, and the hundred Kauravas led by Duryodhana. Bhishma further acted as a mediator in several internal disputes within the royal family, including the division of the Kuru kingdom between Duryodhana and Yudhishthira. Despite his personal adherence to dharma, his loyalty to the throne ultimately compelled him to side with the Kauravas during the Kurukshetra War.

In battle, Bhishma was unmatched in skill and strategy, holding off the Pandava forces for ten days. On the tenth day, however, the Pandava prince Arjuna, aided by Shikhandi (reincarnation of Amba), incapacitated him with a volley of arrows, leaving him lying on a bed of arrows. Bhishma spent fifty-one days in this state, offering counsel to the Pandavas and Kauravas alike. Before his death, timed to the auspicious Uttarayana (winter solstice), he imparted the Vishnu Sahasranama to Yudhishthira and shared his vast knowledge on governance, dharma, and the duties of a king.

Revered in Hindu tradition, Bhishma is extolled for his sacrifice and duty. His death anniversary, observed as Bhishma Ashtami, falls on the eighth lunar day of the bright half of the Magha month (January–February).

== Etymology and epithets ==
According to Monier Monier-Williams, the word Bhishma (Bhīṣma, भीष्म) means "extreme" or "fierce". The word is also used to describe Rudra, the fierce god, as well as the Rakshasa. In the Mahabharata, Devavrata, the son of King Shantanu and Ganga, received this name as he undertook a fierce vow (Bhishma pratigya) of celebacy and gave up his right to the throne. The name Devavrata (देवव्रत), given to him at birth, means "one who is devoted to Gods", according to Monier Monier-Williams.

As Bhishma was the only surviving son of Ganga, he was given many epithets meaning "son of Ganga" — Gangaputra (Gangāputra, गंगापुत्र), Gang (गंग), Gangasuta (Gangāsuta, गंगासुत) and Gangeya (गांगेय). The word Gangadatta (Gangādatta, गंगादत्त) means the gift of Ganga. Patronymics associated with Bhishma include Shantanava (Śāntanava, शान्तनव), Shantanuputra, Shantanusuta and Shantanuja. Bhishma was also referred as:

- Gaurānga (गौरांग) – the one with fair body
- Shvetaveera (Śvetavīra, श्वेतवीर) – a white warrior or the one who is heroic white and has all weapons in white Colour
- Bhārata (भारत) – a descendant of Bharata
- Mahāmahima (महामहिम) – his excellency
- Parashuramashishya (Paraśurāmaśiṣya, परशुरामशिष्य) – disciple of Parashurama
- Pitāmaha (पितामह) – Grandfather (also known as Bhishma Pitamaha; called by Pandavas and Kauravas)

== Birth and early life ==
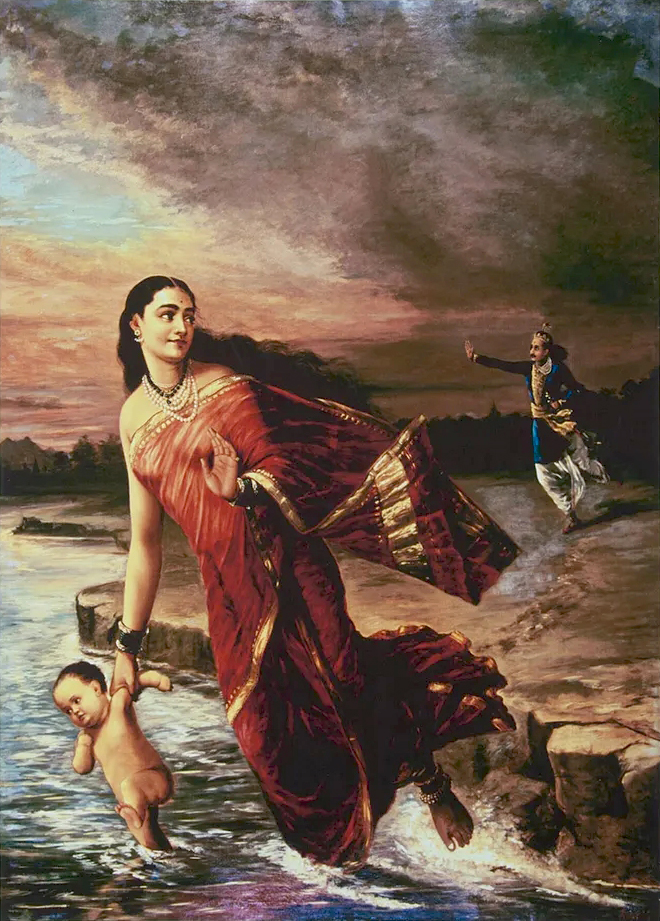
Shantanu stops Ganga from drowning their eighth child, who later was known as Bhishma. Painting by Raja Ravi Varma.

Bhishma's birth and youth are mainly narrated in the Adi Parva book of the epic. He was the only surviving son of Shantanu, a king belonging to the lunar dynasty, and his first wife Ganga, a river goddess. It is believed that he was the avatar of a Vasu named Dyu, alias Prabhasa.

According to the legend, Shantanu, the youngest son of the king Pratipa and the king of Kuru kingdom, was on a hunting trip, when he saw a beautiful woman on the banks of the river Ganga. He fell in love with her and asked for her hand in marriage. The woman agreed to his proposal but with one condition that he would never question her actions; and if this condition was broken, she would abandon him. Shantanu accepted the condition and lived a happy marital life with her. However, when a child was born, the queen would drown him in the river Ganga. One by one, seven sons were born and drowned, while Shantanu remained silent because of his commitment. When she was about to throw the eighth child into the river, Shantanu, unable to control himself, stopped her and confronted her about her actions. After hearing Shantanu's harsh words, the woman revealed herself to be the goddess Ganga and justified her actions and narrated the following story.

Once the celestial Vasus and their wives were enjoying themselves in the forest when the wife of Dyu spotted an excellent cow and asked her husband to steal it. The cow was Nandini, daughter of the wish-fulfilling cow Surabhi, and was owned by the sage Vashishtha. With the help of his brothers, Dyu tried to steal it but Vashishtha caught them and cursed them to be born as mortals and suffer on Earth. Upon their pleading, Vashishta showed mercy and told the other seven Vasus that they would be liberated soon after their birth. However, Dyu being the thief protagonist was cursed to endure a longer life on Earth. Before the birth of her sons, Ganga was requested to kill the seven children soon after their birth. Hearing this, Shantanu was filled with grief and regret and Ganga decided to abandon him as her condition was broken. Before disappearing, she promised Shantanu that she would return his heir to him.

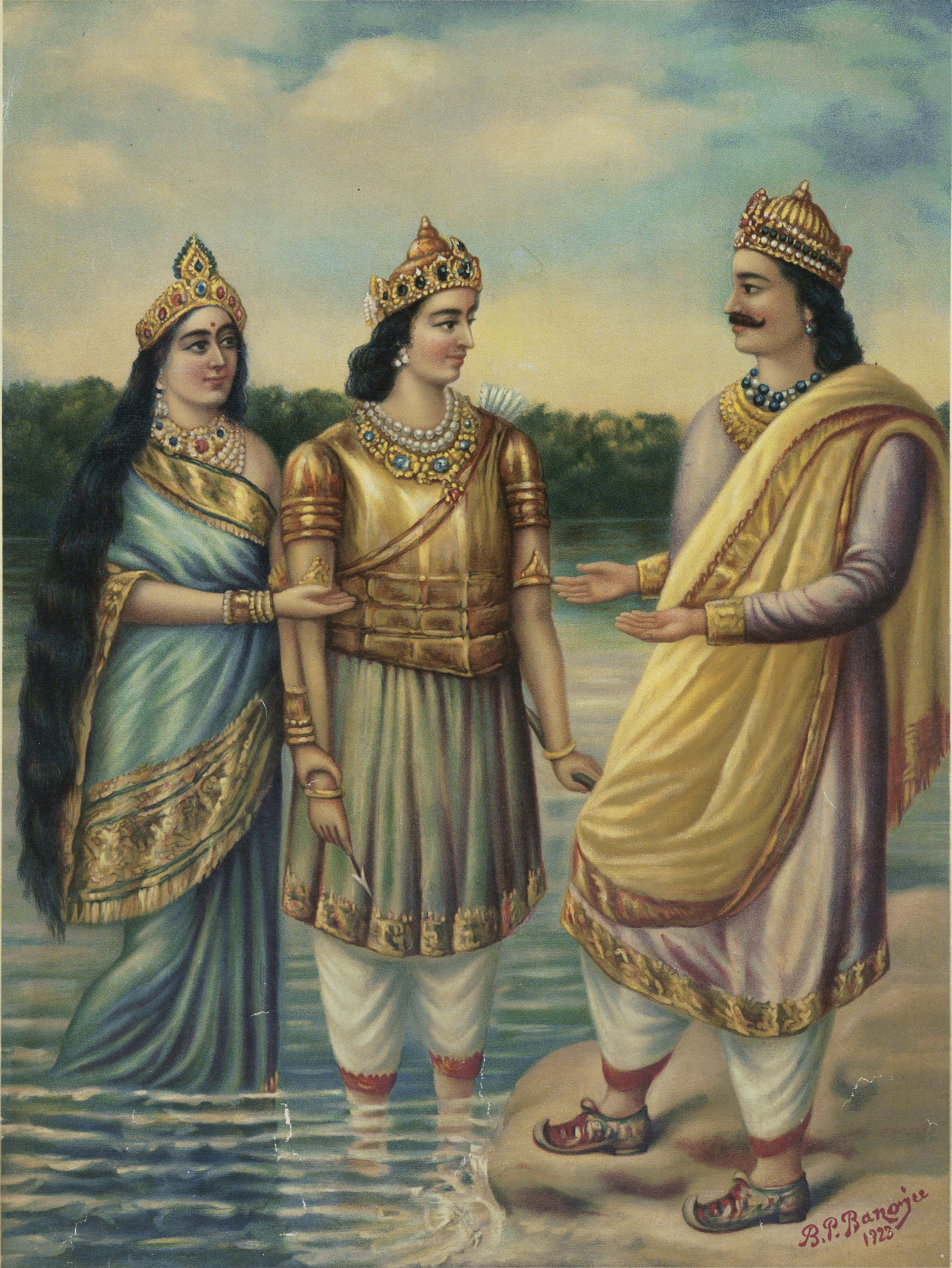
Ganga handing over her son Devavrata to his father. Painting by BP Banerjee.

Ganga named her son Devavrata and took him to different lokas (realms), where he was brought up and trained by many eminent sages.

- Brihaspati and Shukracharya taught Devavrata the duties of kings (Dandaneeti), or political science and other Shastras.
- The sages Vashishtha and Chyavana taught the Vedas and Vedangas to Devavrata.
- Sanatkumara: The eldest son of the god Brahma taught Devavrata the mental and spiritual sciences.
- Markandeya: The immortal son of Mrikanda of Bhrigu's race who acquired everlasting youth from the god Shiva taught Devavrata in the duties of the Yatis.
- Parashurama: The son of Jamadagni trained Devavrata in warfare.
- Indra: The king of the Devas bestowed celestial weapons on Devavrata.

Devavrata possessed many esteemed divine weapons and was resistant against magical warfare. Weapons inducing stupor and mental clouding rendered no effect on him.

Years later, Shantanu was roaming along the banks of the Ganga and observed that the water had become shallow. He saw a young man blocking the water currents with a dam made up of arrows. Shantanu recognised his son because of the similarities and begged Ganga to return him. Ganga appeared in a youthful form and handed Devavrata to Shantanu as per her promise. The young Devavrata was also called Gangadatta.

== The oath ==
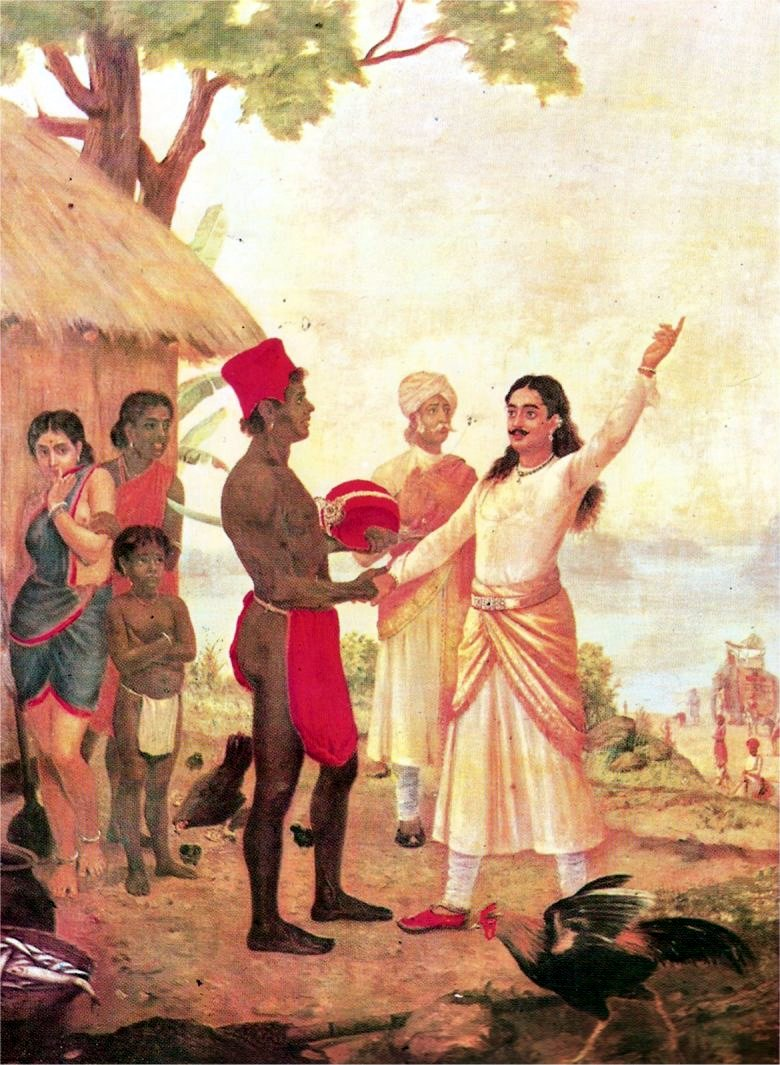
Devavrata taking his oath, painting by Raja Ravi Varma

Shantanu went to the forest and met a fisherwoman named Satyavati, who operated the boats crossing the Yamuna. He fell in love with her and asked for her hand in marriage from her father. However, the fisherman-chief told that he would only agree if Shantanu promised to make the son born to Satyavati as the heir. Shantanu rejected the offer as Devavrata was the heir-apparent, and it would be inappropriate to deny him the throne. So felling dejected, he returned back to the palace. He started to avoid any company and spent his time in bed in grief and solitude. Devavrata noticed his father's sorrow and discovered the reason behind it from a minister.

Devavrata immediately rushed to the cottage of the fishermen-chief and begged him for Satyavati, but the fishermen-chief repeated his former condition. For his father's pleasure and happiness, Devavrata ceded his rights to the throne and promised to put the son of Satyavati on the throne of the kingdom. Satyavati's father was not assured as he claimed that disputes were likely to arise between Satyavati's son and Devavrata's children regarding the rights to the throne. To satisfy him, Devavrata took the vow of lifelong Brahmacharya (celibacy), thus denying himself the pleasures of marital life.

The celestials showered flowers from heaven and he came to be known as "Bhishma" as he took a fierce vow. With the consent of the fisherman, Bhishma took Satyavati to his father in a chariot. When Shantanu was informed about his son's vows, the loving father gave Bhishma a boon known as Iccha Mrityu, through which one has control over the time of one's death. Shantanu and Satyavati soon married and two children – Chitrangada and Vichitravirya were born.

== Affairs of Kuru Kingdom ==
After the death of his father, Bhishma played a major role in the affairs of the Kuru kingdom. He managed the kingdom during succession crises. He also arranged the marriage of his nephews and tried to bring peace between his grand-nephews, the Kauravas and the Pandavas.

The text Harivamsa mentions that during the mourning period after Shantanu's death, Bhishma killed Ugrayudha Paurava, a statesman of Panchala kingdom who lusted for Satyavati and tried to buy her with wealth. According to the Mahabharata, Chitrangada was crowned as the king, however, he was soon killed by a Gandharva (celestial musician). Bhishma performed Chitrangada's funeral rites. Vichitravirya, who was too young to rule, was crowned as the king by Bhishma but the actual control of the kingdom was under Satyavati until he reached adulthood. Bhishma aided Satyavati during that time.

=== Swayamvara of the Kashi princesses and battle with Parashurama ===
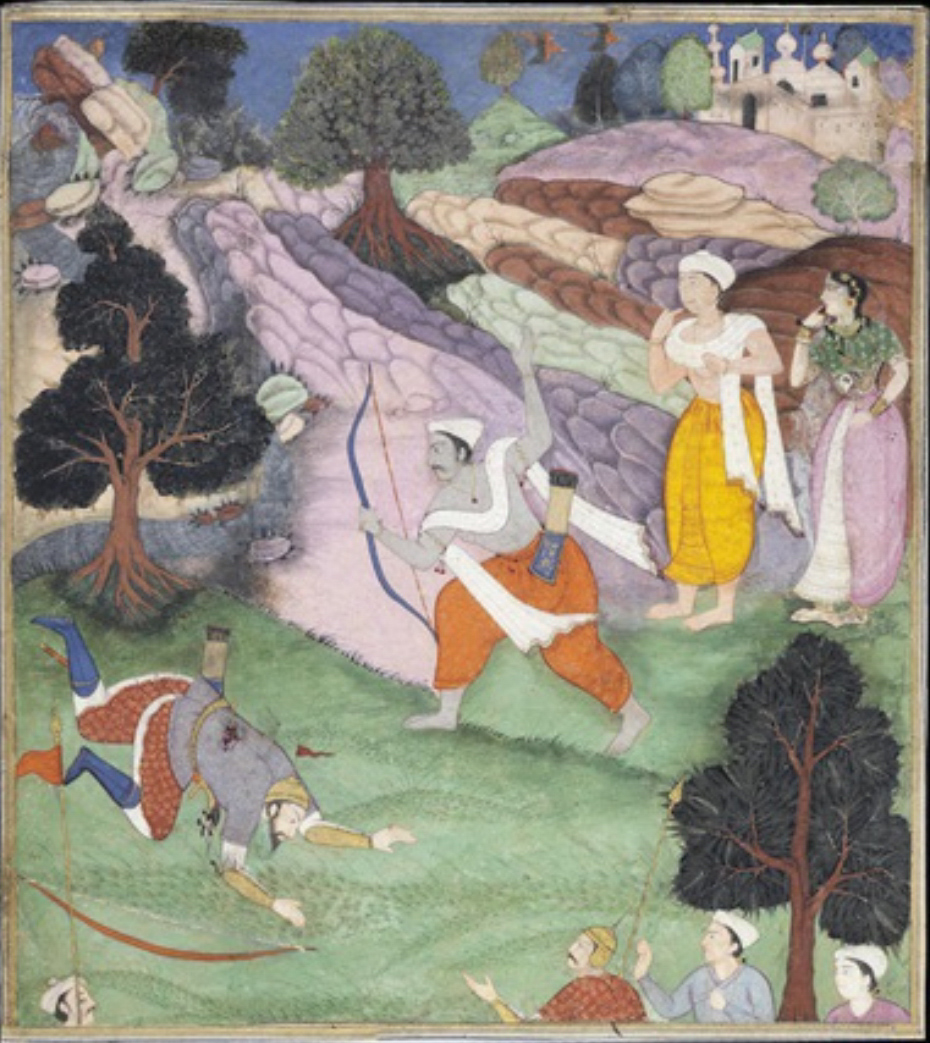
Parashurama shoots Bhishma while Amba watches them, folio from Razmnama (Persian translation of the Mahabharata), ca. 1616

When Vichitravirya grew up, Bhishma decided to bring Amba, Ambika and Ambalika—the princesses of Kashi kingdom—and get them married to him. Bhishma reached the kingdom and fought Shalva, easily defeating him and rightfully won over the princesses, who were choosing their spouse in a Swayamvara (ceremony where a woman chooses her husband from a group of suitors either by holding a competition or a task and the winner marries the princess). Shalva, the ruler of Shalwa or Saubala Kingdom and the lover of Amba, attempted to stop Bhishma but failed. Upon reaching Hastinapura, Ambika and Ambalika consented to marry Vichitravirya, while Amba told Bhishma about her love for Shalva. Learning about her feelings, Bhishma sent Amba to Saubala Kingdom.

The Udyoga Parva further narrates about Amba as well as the battle between Bhishma and Parashurama. When Amba requested Shalva to marry her, he rejected her, claiming that he was already humiliated during the Svayamvara. He also told her that he could not accept a woman who was won by another man. A variant suggests that after Amba returned to Hastinapur, Bhishma then asked Vichitravirya to marry her, but he also refused to marry her as she loved another man. With no one to accept her, Amba blamed Bhishma for her misery and wanted revenge from him. She went to the kings of several kingdom and tried to convince them to slay Bhishma; but none of them agreed. After she was advised by some sages, she met Parasurama, Bhishma's teacher and successfully convinced him to vow to help her.

Parasurama went to Kurukshetra and sent a message to Bhishma to meet him. Bhishma arrived at the place and offered his service to his teacher. Wanting to solve the situation, Parasurama ordered him to marry Amba, telling him that it was his duty. However, Bhishma denied it, reminding him about his vow. This enraged Parashurama and he threatened Bhishma with death. Bhishma tried to calm him but it failed. An intense battle began with both protecting their words. They fought for twenty-three days, each using celestial weapons. Ganga tried to stop them but was unsuccessful. On the twenty-fourth day of battle, Bhishma attempted to use the Prashwapastra against Parashurama, but the divine sage Narada and the gods intervened and showed their concern over the use of powerful weapons which could destroy the world. Parashurama ended the conflict and the battle was declared a stalemate. After hearing about the event, Amba decided to take her revenge on her own and did severe austerities to please the god Shiva. Shiva appeared in front of her and assured that she would be reborn and become instrumental in Bhishma's death. Satisfied, she then made a funeral pyre of woods and killed herself. Years later, she was reborn as Shikhandini, daughter of King Drupada of Panchala kingdom.

=== Political influences ===
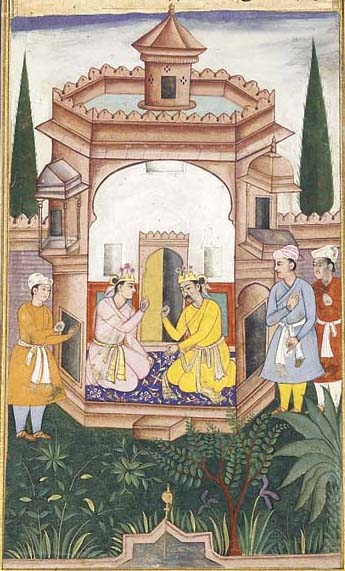
Yudhishthira with Bhishma, from the Razm-Namah, by Fattu, 1598

Vichitravirya was crowned as the king of Hastinapura and he ruled for a few years, before he died of tuberculosis. He had no offspring and the lineage was at the risk of extinction. Satyavati persuaded Bhishma to marry the widows of Vichitravirya and rule as the king or at least impregnate them to produce an heir. However Bhishma refused the proposal and told her about his vow. He then suggested that a sage could be requested to perform Niyoga (a practice in which another person is requested to impregnate a woman, whose husband is deceased or impotent). Satyavati called her premarital born son, Vyasa, to impregnate her daughters-in-law. Three children were born— Dhritarashtra from Ambika, Pandu from Ambalika and Vidura from a maid. Bhishma trained them and also got them married. He arranged the wedding of Dhritarashtra with Gandhari, the princess of Gandhara Kingdom. He also brought Madri for Pandu from Madra Kingdom and also got Vidura married to the daughter of Devaka.

Despite Dhritrashtra being the eldest among the brothers, he was denied the throne because of his blindness. Pandu was appointed as the king, but later, he renounced his position and went to the forest with his wives. Dhritarashtra was made the de facto king and Gandhari gave birth to the Kauravas siblings. Meanwhile, Pandu's two wives gave birth to the five Pandava brothers. After the premature death of Pandu, his first wife Kunti returned to Hastinapur with her sons. Satyavati, along with Ambika and Ambalika, decided to retire to the forest for penance, leaving Bhishma with the responsibility of the kingdom. A Brahmin warrior Drona, was hired by Bhishma to train the princes in warfare.

From their childhood, the Kauravas hated their cousins and tried to kill them multiple times. One such was the event of Lakshagriha, in which Duryodhana—the eldest Kaurava—decided to burn the Pandavas. Bhishma was despondent but Vidura consoled him and told them that the Pandavas were alive. The event led to the succession dispute between Duryodhana and Yudhishthira. To resolve this, Bhishma advised Dhritarashtra to divide the kingdom among the princes. The Pandavas made their capital in Indraprastha and performed the Rajasuya to achieve sovereignty and the status of the emperor. Bhishma supported them and attended the ceremony. He suggested Yudhishthira give Krishna the highest place in the ceremony, but this enraged Shishupala—an enemy of Krishna. He initially protested to give the position to Bhishma, but after Bhishma showed no objection in honouring Krishna, Shishupala started insulting him.

Bhishma was present during the gambling game in Hastinapur, where Draupadi—the wife of the Pandavas—was humiliated in the court. When she questioned the dharma of Yudhishthira losing her in the game, Bhishma tried but failed to answer her and described dharma to be subtle.

Bhishma also led the Virata war, an operation undertook by the Kauravas and the Trigarthas to rob the cows from King Virata and to reveal the hidden Pandavas. The combined Kaurava and Trigartha forces were defeated by Arjuna alone. Arjuna handed Bhishma a defeat in their duel, but when the former used the 'Sammohana', Bhishma remained unaffected while the rest of the army fell into stupor.

After the Pandavas returned following the completion of their exile, Bhishma encouraged Dritharashtra and Duryodhana to give back Indraprastha to them, doing his best to avoid the war. Bhishma was present during Krishna's peace mission visit to the court of Hasthinapura and when the true form of the lord was revealed following Duryodhana's hostility, he was among few who were not blinded by the divine light emanating from the Viswarupa.

== The Kurukshetra War ==
In the great battle at Kurukshetra, Bhishma was the supreme commander of the Kaurava forces for ten days. He fought reluctantly on the side of the Kauravas, having vowed to protect the city of Hastinapur from all threats and invasions.

Before the battle, at the Kauravas army's assembly, Bhishma analysed and classified the warriors of the Kaurava side and famously describe Karna as an Athirathi, a class of warrior inferior to a Maharathi. This infuriated Karna and he took a vow that as long as Bhishma is commanding the forces, he will not participate in the war. In truth, both sides of the affront were aware of Karna's true lineage, and had to make pretext to prevent Karna from battling his brothers.

Bhishma was one of the most powerful warriors of his time and in history. He acquired his prowess and invincibility from being the son of the sacred Ganga and by being a student of Lord Parashurama. Despite being about five generations old, Bhishma was too powerful to be defeated by any warrior alive at that time. Every day, he slew at least 10,000 soldiers and about a 1,000 rathas.

At the beginning of the war, Bhishma vowed not to kill any of the Pandavas, as he loved them, being their grand-uncle. Duryodhana often confronted Bhishma alleging that he was not actually fighting for the Kaurava camp as he would not kill any of the Pandavas. He also tried his best to prevent the death of any of the Kauravas in the war, as he loved all his grand-nephews.

Duryodhana approached Bhishma on the night of the eighth day and accused him of not fighting the battle to his full strength because of his affection for the Pandavas. On the next day there was an intense battle between Bhishma and Arjuna. Although Arjuna was very very skilled and powerful, he was not fighting seriously as his heart was not in it to hurt his beloved grandsire Bhishma. Bhishma fired arrows such that Arjuna and Krishna were both injured. Krishna, enraged over Bhishma's devastation of the Pandavas army and Arjuna's hesitation to fight him with full force, got down from his charioteer seat and picked up a displaced wheel, intending to use it in place of his Sudarshana Chakra. Seeing this, both Arjuna and Bhishma stopped their battle, with the protector of Hastinapur humbly telling the avatar of Vishnu that he would immediately lay down his life should Krishna took action here and now. Arjuna ultimately convinced Krishna to remain true to his vow and returned themselves to their chariot. Thus Bhishma fulfilled his vow of forcing Krishna to raise a weapon. Then Arjuna used stronger weapons, injuring Bhishma. Bhishma and Arjuna's duel was praised by the gods themselves as they watched over it from the sky.

The war was thus locked in a stalemate. As the Pandavas mulled over this situation, Krishna advised them to visit Bhishma himself and request him to suggest a way out of this stalemate. Bhishma loved the Pandavas and knew that he stood as an obstacle in their path to victory and so when they visited Bhishma, he gave them a hint as to how they could defeat him. He told them that if faced by one who had once been of the opposite gender, he would lay down his arms and fight no longer.

Later Krishna told Arjuna how he could bring down Bhishma, through the help of Shikhandi. The Pandavas were not agreeable to such a ploy, as by using such tactics they would not be following the path of Dharma, but Krishna suggested a clever alternative. And thus, on the next day, the tenth day of battle Shikhandi was accompanied by Arjuna as Arjuna was his chariot protector and they faced Bhishma who avoided Shikhandi. He was then felled in battle by Arjuna, pierced by innumerable arrows. Arjuna shot arrows at Bhishma, piercing his entire body. Thus, as was preordained (Mahadeva's boon to Amba that she would be the cause of Bhishma's fall) Shikhandi, that is, Amba reincarnated was the cause of Bhishma's fall.

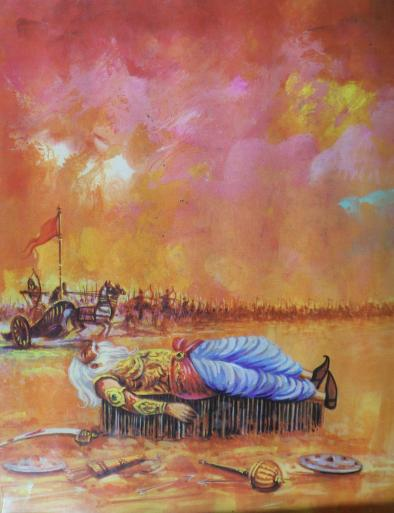
Fall of Bhisma

As Bhishma fell, his whole body was held above the ground by the shafts of Arjuna's arrows which protruded from his back, and through his arms and legs. Seeing Bhishma lying on such a bed of arrows humbled even the gods who watched from the heavens in reverence. They silently blessed the mighty warrior. When the young princes of both armies gathered around him, inquiring if there was anything they could do, he told them that while his body lay on the bed of arrows above the ground, his head hung unsupported. Hearing this, many of the princes, both Kaurava and the Pandava alike brought him pillows of silk and velvet, but he refused them. He asked Arjuna to give him a pillow fit for a warrior. Arjuna then removed three arrows from his quiver and placed them underneath Bhishma's head, the pointed arrow tips facing upwards. To quench the war veteran's thirst, Arjuna shot an arrow into the earth, and a jet stream of water rose up and into Bhishma's mouth. It is said that Ganga herself rose to quench her son's thirst.

After the proceedings of the tenth day, Karna visited Bhishma alone at night and Bhishma reveals to him that he had prior knowledge of his birth secret and urges him to make peace with the Pandavas. Bhishma also tells him that declaring him as an Athirathi and tricking him to make the vow of not fighting was his ploy to avert Karna clashing with his brothers. He declares that he considered Karna as a Maharathi as well and that he had deep appreciation for his skill as a warrior. Karna however declines to join the Pandavas and leaves after a brief moment of sharing his respect and admiration to Bhishma.

== Death ==
After the war, while on his deathbed (arrow bed), he gave deep and meaningful instructions to Yudhishthira on statesmanship and the duties of a king. Bhishma always gave priority to Dharma. He always walked in the path of Dharma, despite his state because of the vow, he was supposed to forcefully follow the orders of his king Dhritharashtra, which were mostly Adharma, he was totally upset. He was sure he must let dharma win and Pandavas win, but the way he led the war and stayed silent were his sins in a way and he paid for it with the bed of arrows. Finally, Bhishma gave up the fight, focusing his life force and breath, sealing the wounds, and waiting for the auspicious moment to give up his body on the arrow bed. He did wait for about 58 nights for the winter solstice and chose "Magh maha Sukla paksha Astami tithi" after Uttarayana to give up his body on the arrow bed. His body was later cremated by Emperor Yudhishthira in a great ceremony.

Mahabharata states that he attained salvation after his death. He was granted the Maatru Lok (which is considered even above Swarga, the heaven). Magha (month) Shukla Ashtami marks the death anniversary of Bhishma Pitamah (Patriarch), the day being known as Bhishma Ashtami. Hindus observe Ekodishta Śrāddha for him on this day, for many generations, and can only be performed by those whose fathers are not alive. Bhishma Panchaka vrata (fast) is observed in all Vishnu temples, starting from Bhishma Ashtami, for five days until Bhishma Dwadasi. People believe that they will have a son with the steadfast qualities of Bhishma if they observe these holy rituals on the river banks. It is also said that those who will perform this fast will live a happy life and attain salvation after their death.

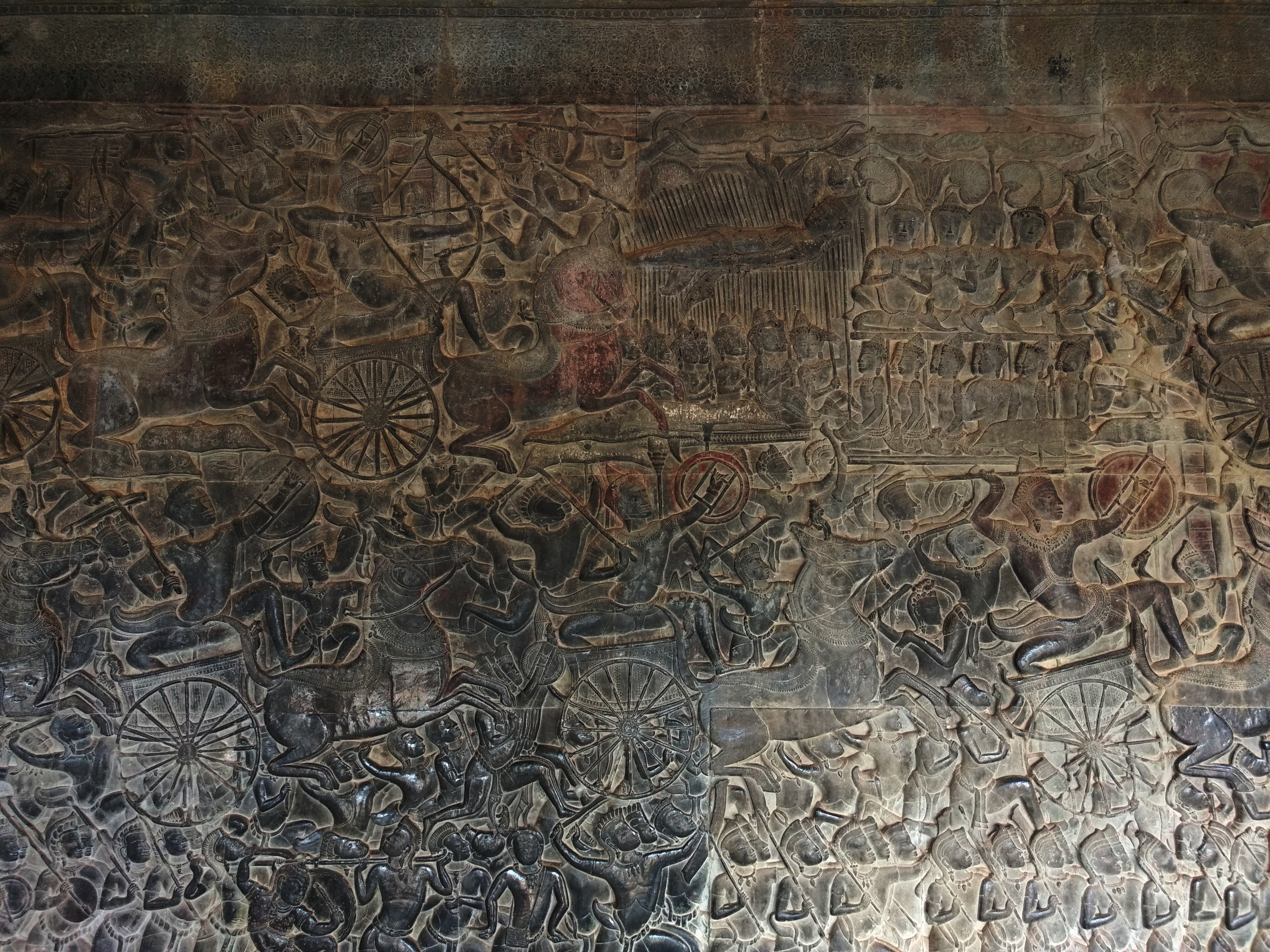
Bhishma on bed of arrows depicted in Angkor Wat

== In popular culture ==
=== Films and television ===
His life has been made into many films in different Indian languages. The first silent film, Bhishma Pratigya, was made in 1921. During the talkie period, the first film was made in Hindi (1937). It was followed by a Bengali film in 1942 directed by Jyotish Bannerjee. Jahar Ganguli played the title role. In 1950, another Hindi film starring Nargis was made, titled Bhishma Pratigya.

- Telugu cinema, two films were made. The first film on Bhishma was made in 1944 directed by Chitrapu Narayana Rao. Jandhyala Gourinatha Sastry played the role of Bhishma. B. A. Subba Rao made a film in 1962 titled Bhishma. The title role was played by N. T. Rama Rao.
- Bhishma's character was played by Mukesh Khanna in the B.R. Chopra's classic television series Mahabharat (1988).
- Sotigui Kouyaté played Bhishma in Peter Brook's 1989 film The Mahabharata.
- In Ramanand Sagar's television series Shri Krishna (1993) Sunil Nagar portrayed the character.
- Surendra Pal portrayed the character in Chandraprakash Dwivedi's Ek Aur Mahabharat.
- In the television series Draupadi (2001) Pankaj Dheer played the character.
- In Balaji Telefilms' Kahaani Hamaaray Mahaabhaarat Ki (2008) Ronit Roy played the role.
- In Star Plus' television series Mahabharat (2013) Arav Chowdharry played the role of Bhishma.
- Amitabh Bachchan has also voiced the character in the animated Mahabharat (2013).
- Naved Aslam in Sony TV's Suryaputra Karn.
- Ambareesh played the role of Bhishma in the 2019 mythological Kannada movie Kurukshetra, which was his last film as well.
- In the 2022 Malayalam movie Bheeshma Parvam, the lead character (played by Mammootty ) was based on Bheeshma. The story and characters were inspired by both Mahabharat and The Godfather.

=== Modern references ===
The tank T-90 main battle tank (MBT), one of the world's most advanced MBTs acquired from Russia for the Indian Army, is named after Bhishma.
