= Dakshinayana =

Six months period in Indian calendars

Dakshinayana (Sanskrit: दक्षिणायन, romanized: Dakṣiṇāyana) is a Hindu astronomical concept that refers to the movement of the sun to the south of the equator, and is also a term that indicates the six-month period between the summer solstice and the winter solstice. Dakshinayana begins on Karka Sankranti or July 16, as it marks the transition of the sun into Karka rashi (Cancer).

It marks the end of the six-month Uttarayana period of Hindu calendar and the beginning of the eponymous period called the Dakshinayana, which itself ends at Makara Sankranti and the Uttarayana period begins.

According to the Puranas, Dakshinayana marks the period when the deities are in their celestial sleep, regarded to be their night.
