= Maharathi =

Maharathi may refer to:

- Maharathi (warrior), in Hindu mythology
- Marhatta (Maratha Kshatriya)
