= Uttarayana =

Annual northward movement of the sun

The term Uttarāyaṇa (commonly Uttarayanam) is derived from two different Sanskrit words – "uttaram" (North) and "ayanam" (movement) – thus indicating the northward movement of the Sun. In the Gregorian calendar, this pertains to the "actual movement of the sun with respect to the earth." It is also known as the six-month period that occurs between the winter solstice and the summer solstice (approximately 20 December - 20 June). According to the Indian solar calendar, it refers to the movement of the Sun through the zodiac. This difference occurs because the solstices continually precess at a rate of about 50 arcseconds per year due to the precession of the equinoxes, i.e. this difference is the difference between the sidereal and tropical zodiacs. The Surya Siddhanta bridges this difference by juxtaposing the four solstitial and equinoctial points with four of the twelve boundaries of the rashis.

The complement of Uttarayana is Dakshinayana (the southward movement of the Sun). It is the period between Karka Sankranti and Makara Sankranti as per the sidereal zodiac and between the summer solstice and winter solstice as per the tropical zodiac.

== Etymology ==
The term Uttarāyana is derived from two Sanskrit words: uttara (उत्तर), meaning "north," and ayana (अयन), meaning "movement," "path," or "journey." Together, the term literally means "the northward movement", referring to the northward motion of the sun relative to the Earth. The opposite period is known as Dakshinayana, meaning "the southward movement," referring to the Sun's apparent movement toward the south after the summer solstice.

== Astronomical significance ==
In astronomical terms, Uttarayana refers to the period during which the Sun appears to move northward relative to the celestial equator, beginning immediately after the winter solstice and continuing until the summer solstice. This period lasts approximately six months, from around 21 December to 21 June. This apparent movement occurs because the Earth is tilted on its axis by about 23.4°, causing the Sun's apparent position in the sky to gradually shift north and south throughout the year. When the Sun begins moving northward after the winter solstice, the period is called Uttarayana; when it begins moving southward after the summer solstice, the period is called Dakshinayana.

== Architecture ==
Ancient Indian temple architecture includes examples of planned orientation with respect to solar movements, including the winter solstice. Many temples are aligned facing the east, allowing sunlight to enter specific parts of the structure on particular days of the year. The western entrance gate of the Angkor Wat is aligned such that on the winter solstice, the starting of Uttarayana, the rising sun appears in line with the distant temple of Prasat Kuk Bangro located approximately 5.5 kilometres away. On the summer solstice, which marks the end of the Uttarayana period, the sun is seen directly overhead of the Modhera Sun Temple with the light falling directly on the deity without casting any shadows on the temple.

== Uttarayana in various treatises ==
=== Ayurveda ===
In Ayurveda, the period of Uttarayana is associated with seasonal changes believed to influence human health and bodily balance. Ayurvedic texts describe this six-month period as Adana Kala ("the time of taking away"), referring to the belief that the Sun's increasing intensity gradually draws moisture and strength from living beings and the environment. During this period, the cooling and nourishing qualities of the earth are believed to diminish as solar heat increases. Classical Ayurvedic literature on "Ritucharya" states that tikta (bitter), kashaya (astringent), and katu (pungent) rasas (tastes) become more dominant in nature during this time. These qualities contribute to dryness in the body and a gradual reduction in bala (physical strength or vitality).

=== Surya Siddhanta ===
Mayasura, the composer of Surya Siddhanta, defines Uttarayana, at the time of composition, as the period between the Makara Sankranti (which currently occurs around January 14) and Karka Sankranti (which currently occurs around July 16). Lātadeva describes this as half revolutions of the Sun, using the terms Uttarayana and Dakshinayana to describe the "northern and southern progress" respectively. Bal Gangadhar Tilak, a scholar and mathematician, proposes an alternative, early vedic definition of Uttarayana as starting from Vernal Equinox and ending with Autumnal Equinox. This definition interprets the term "Uttara Ayana" as "northern movement" instead of "northward movement", i.e. as the movement of the Earth in the region North of the Equator. In support of this proposal, he points to another tradition that the Uttarayana is considered the daytime of the Gods residing at the North Pole which tradition makes sense only if we define Uttarayana as the period between the Vernal and Autumnal equinoxes (when there is Midnight Sun at the North Pole). Conversely, Dakshinaya is defined as the period between the Autumnal and Vernal Equinoxes, when there is midnight sun at the South Pole. This period is also referred to as Pitrayana (with the Pitrus (i.e. ancestors) being placed at the South Pole).

=== Drik Siddhanta ===
Illustration of the movement of the Sun north and south of the Equator, caused by axial tilt of the Earth.

Illustration of the observed effect of Earth's axial tilt.

This festival is currently celebrated on the 14th or 15 January but due to axial precession of the Earth it will continue to shift away from the actual season. The season occurs based on tropical sun (without ayanamsha). The Earth revolves around Sun with a tilt of 23.44 degrees. When the tilt is facing the Sun it is defined as summer and when the tilt is away from the Sun it is called winter. That is the reason when there is summer north of the equator, it will be winter south of the equator. Because of this tilt, the Sun appears to travel north and south of the equator. This motion of the Sun transitioning from south to north is called Uttarayana (the Sun is moving towards north). Once the Sun reaches north, it begins moving south and is called Dakshinayana – the Sun is moving towards south. This causes seasons which are dependent on equinoxes and solstices.

== Religious significance ==
In the Hindu epic Mahabharata, the day of Uttarayan marks the death of Bhishma. Bhishma had the ability to choose the time of his death and although mortally wounded in war, he chose to delay his death until Uttarayan. According to the Bhagavad Gita, those who die when the Sun is on its northward course (from south to north) attain a higher spiritual state.

During the Uttarayana period, devotees undertake certain rituals to benefit during the auspicious time. Devotees often take part in pilgrimages to bathe in Prayag, where the Yamuna, Ganga and Saraswati rivers meet. Hindu cosmological tradition also mentions the six-month period of Uttarayana as the "day of the devas," while the six-month period of Dakshinayana represents the "night of the devas." Together, these two half-year cycles form a single full day in the time scale of the devas.

=== Festivals ===
Several festivals and regional observances occur around the time associated with the beginning of Uttarayana. These include Makara Sankranti, which marks the Sun's transition into the zodiac sign of Capricorn, Pongal in Tamil Nadu, Lohri in northern India, and the International Kite Festival in Gujarat, which is also colloquially called Uttarayan in Gujarat. Although these celebrations occur around the same seasonal transition, they are distinct festivals and not synonymous with the astronomical concept of Uttarayana.

== Difference between Uttarayana and Makara Sankranti ==
There is a common misconception that the festival of Makara Sankranti marks the beginning of Uttarayana (The Sun's northward movement). In astronomical terms, the Sun begins its apparent northward journey (Uttarayana) immediately after the winter solstice; for example, in 2022 this occurred from 23 December, the day following the solstice on 22 December. Consequently, Makar Sankranti can no longer be described as the beginning of Uttarayana, a term in Sanskrit and Indian scriptures that refers specifically to the Sun's northward movement. Instead, Makar Sankranti denotes the Sun's entry into the sidereal zodiac sign of Makar (Capricorn) from Dhanu (Sagittarius), as makar refers to the zodiac sign and sankranti in Sanskrit means "transition" or "entry." Historically, approximately 1,700 years ago, the occurrence of Uttarayana and Makar Sankranti coincided, which led to their longstanding association.

However, due to the precession of Earth's axis, amounting to roughly one degree every 72 years (or 50 seconds of time per year), the two events have gradually diverged. As a result, Makar Sankranti now comes on January 14th, while Uttarayana continues to be observed on the day after winter solstice. In 272 CE, Makara Sankranti was on 21 December. In 1000 CE, Makara Sankranti was on 31 December and now it falls on January 14. After 9000 years, Makara Sankranti will be in June. Uttarayana on the other hand, has always been the day after winter solstice, around December 21st. All Drika Panchanga makers like mypanchang.com, datepanchang, janmabhumi panchang, rashtriya panchang and Vishuddha Siddhanta Panjika use the position of the tropical Sun to determine Uttarayana and Dakshinayana.
