= Karma-Sanyasa Yoga =

Chapter 5 of the Bhagavad Gita

- ← Jnana Karma Sanyasa Yoga Atma-Samyama Yoga →
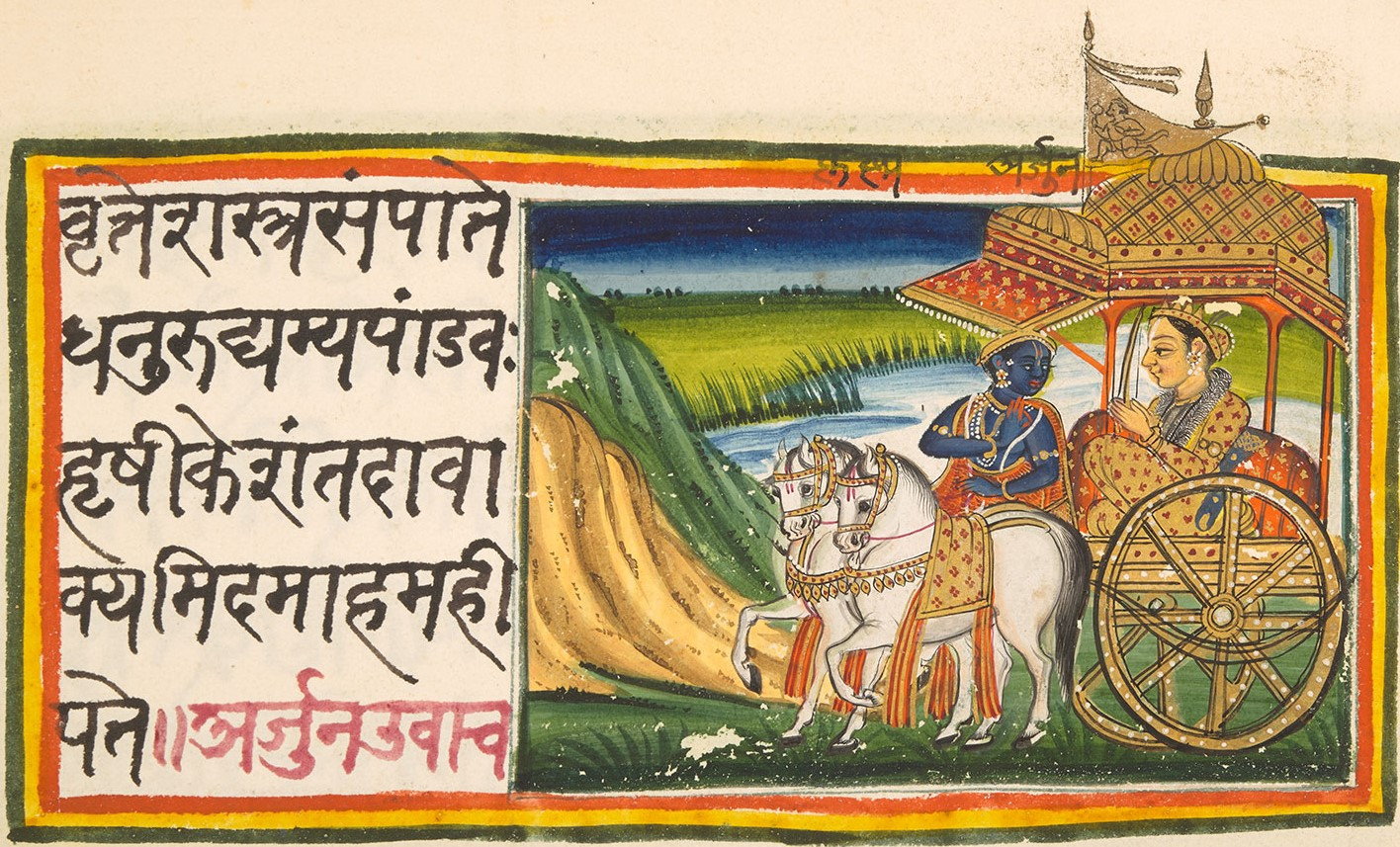

Information
- Religion: Hinduism
- Author: Traditionally attributed to Vyasa
- Language: Sanskrit
- Verses: 29

Karma-Sanyasa Yoga (Sanskrit: कर्मसन्न्यासयोग, romanized: Karmasannyāsayōga), also rendered Karma-Samnyasa Yoga, is the fifth of eighteen chapters of the Bhagavad Gita. The chapter has a total of 29 shlokas. The chapter is the 27th chapter of Bhishma Parva, the sixth book of the Mahabharata.

== Etymology ==
In the Bhagavad Gita, Karma-Sanyasa Yoga refers to the "Yoga of Renunciation of Action". Karma, means action, Sanyasa means renunciation, and Yoga refers to the path or discipline. This chapter explores the concept of performing one's duties without attachment to the results, advocating a balanced approach to action and detachment. The etymology is derived from Sanskrit words that reflect the central theme of selfless action and renunciation taught in this chapter of the Gita.

== Overview ==
- 1: Arjuna's Confusion - Arjuna expresses his dilemma about choosing between renunciation and action.
- 2-5: Selfless Action - Krishna explains the importance of selfless action without attachment.
- 6-12: The Nature of Renunciation - Krishna describes the characteristics of a true renunciant.
- 13-19: Different Paths - Krishna contrasts the paths of knowledge and action, emphasizing that both lead to liberation.
- 20-24: Detachment and Equanimity - Krishna speaks of the state of equanimity achieved through detachment from outcomes.
- 25-30: The Wise and the Ignorant - Krishna compares the attitudes and behaviours of the wise and the ignorant.
- 31-37: Action without Desire - Krishna discusses how to perform actions without desire for rewards.
- 38-44: Detachment from Fruits - Krishna explains the essence of selfless action and detachment from results.
- 45-47: Transcendence - Krishna concludes by highlighting that true wisdom transcends both action and renunciation.

This chapter emphasizes that it's not the type of action that matters, but the attitude with which actions are performed. It encourages selfless dedication to duty, without becoming attached to success or failure. The shlokas delve into the concepts of renunciation, selflessness, and the nature of true wisdom.

== Discussion ==
In this chapter, Krishna imparts teachings about Karma-Sanyasa Yoga to Arjuna. This chapter is a continuation of the discourse on different paths to spiritual enlightenment. Karma-Sanyasa Yoga, also known as the Path of Renunciation of Action, focuses on performing one's duties and responsibilities without attachment to the outcomes. Krishna's emphasizes the importance of selfless action, explaining that renunciation of actions isn't achieved by abstaining from activities but by performing them without selfish desires. He encourages Arjuna to engage in his duty as a warrior, highlighting that true renunciation involves detachment from the results of actions. Krishna explains that human beings are naturally driven to engage in various actions due to their inherent nature. Instead of avoiding these actions, individuals should align themselves with the divine will and perform their duties in a spirit of dedication. He introduces the concept of Nishkama Karma — performing actions without any desire for personal gain or recognition.

By practicing this, individuals can purify their minds and gradually detach themselves from the cycle of birth and death. Krishna stresses the importance of equanimity in success and failure. He advises Arjuna to view both outcomes with an even mind, understanding that they are temporary and not the essence of the true self. This teaching echoes the principle of Samatvam Yoga Uchyate – the equanimity of mind.

Furthermore, Krishna explains that one who has mastered the art of selfless action achieves a state of inner freedom. Such an individual, unaffected by dualities, is liberated from materialistic desires and gains spiritual insight. Krishna compares the person who remains steady in equanimity to a lotus leaf untouched by water. Throughout the discourse, Krishna clarifies that both renunciation and selfless action lead to spiritual growth. He suggests that the path of Karma Sanyasa is more suitable for Arjuna, given his warrior nature and societal obligations. Unlike a renunciant, who retreats from society, Arjuna's duty lies in fulfilling his responsibilities as a warrior.

== Karma Yoga and Karma-Sanyasa Yoga ==
Karma Yoga and Karma-Sanyasa Yoga are paths outlined in the Bhagavad Gita.

Karma Yoga is the path of selfless action and is centered around performing one's duties and responsibilities without attachment to the outcomes. It emphasises dedicating one's actions to a higher purpose or to the divine, without being attached to success or failure.

Karma-Sanyasa Yoga, on the other hand, is the path of renunciation. It involves renouncing the results of actions and even the attachments to performing actions. This path encourages withdrawing from the worldly affairs and focusing on spiritual pursuits, detachment, and self-realization.

In essence, Karma Yoga is about selfless action within the world, while Karma-Sanyasa Yoga is about renunciation and detachment from worldly ties.

== Themes ==
- Detachment from Results — performing duties without attachment to the outcomes. It encourages individuals to focus on their responsibilities rather than being consumed by the results, leading to a sense of inner peace and equanimity.
- Nishkama Karma — selfless action. It encourages individuals to act without selfish desire or personal gain, but rather for the greater good of society and in alignment with their duty (dharma).
- Renunciation and Non-Attachment — one can renounce the world mentally while remaining engaged physically. Non-attachment helps individuals remain unaffected by success or failure, joy or sorrow.
- Jnana (Knowledge) and Karma (Action) — reconciles the apparent contradiction between knowledge and action. It suggests that both can coexist, and when pursued together, lead to spiritual growth and liberation.
- Balance and Equilibrium — avoid extremes and practicing moderation, individuals can lead a harmonious life that promotes inner tranquility.
- Yoga of Discipline — discipline is important in actions, thoughts, and emotions. It encourages individuals to control their mind and senses, thus facilitating self-mastery.
- Purity of Mind and Intent — state of mind is crucial. Performing actions with a pure and selfless heart contributes to personal growth and spiritual evolution.

These themes collectively guide individuals towards leading a life of purpose, selflessness, and spiritual growth while fulfilling their worldly responsibilities.

== See also ==
- Arjuna Vishada-Yoga
- Samkhya Yoga
- Karma Yoga
- Jnana Karma Sanyasa Yoga
