= Janeu (sacred thread) =

Sacred thread in Hinduism

- जनेऊ
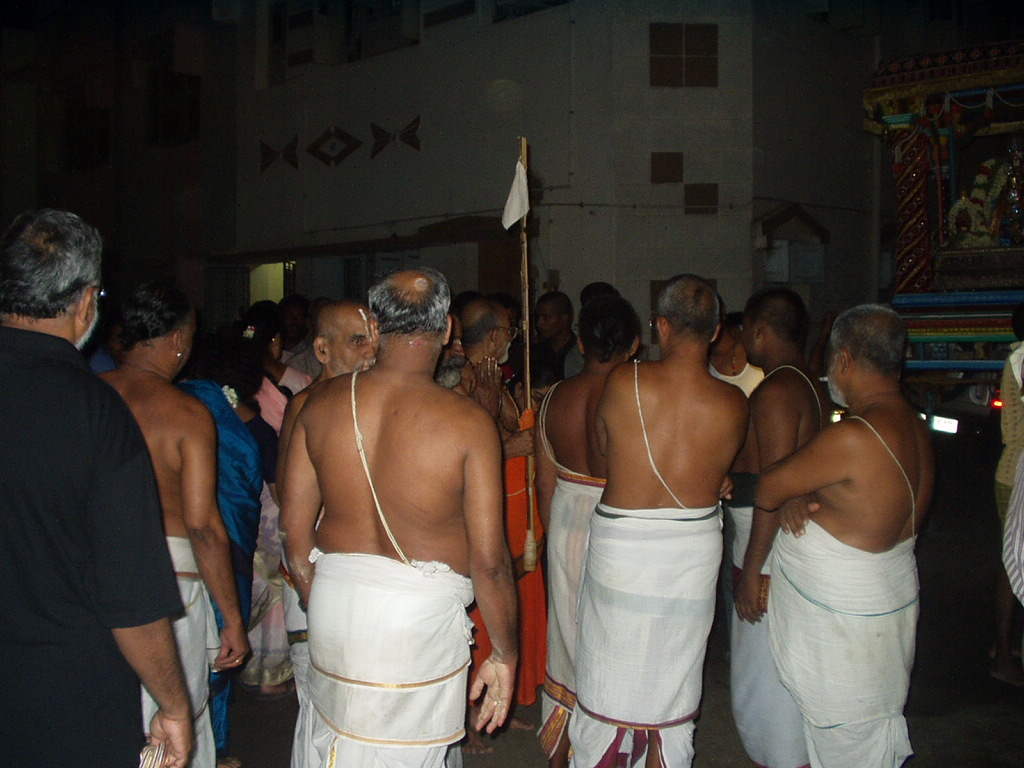
- Sacred thread Janeu worn by Brahmins
- Type: Sacred thread in Hinduism
- Classification: Hinduism
- Scripture: Brahmopanishad; Padma Purana
- Structure: Cotton thread
- Region: Indian subcontinent
- Founder: Lord Brahma
- Other names: Yagyopavit; Trivrutsutram; Brahmasutra

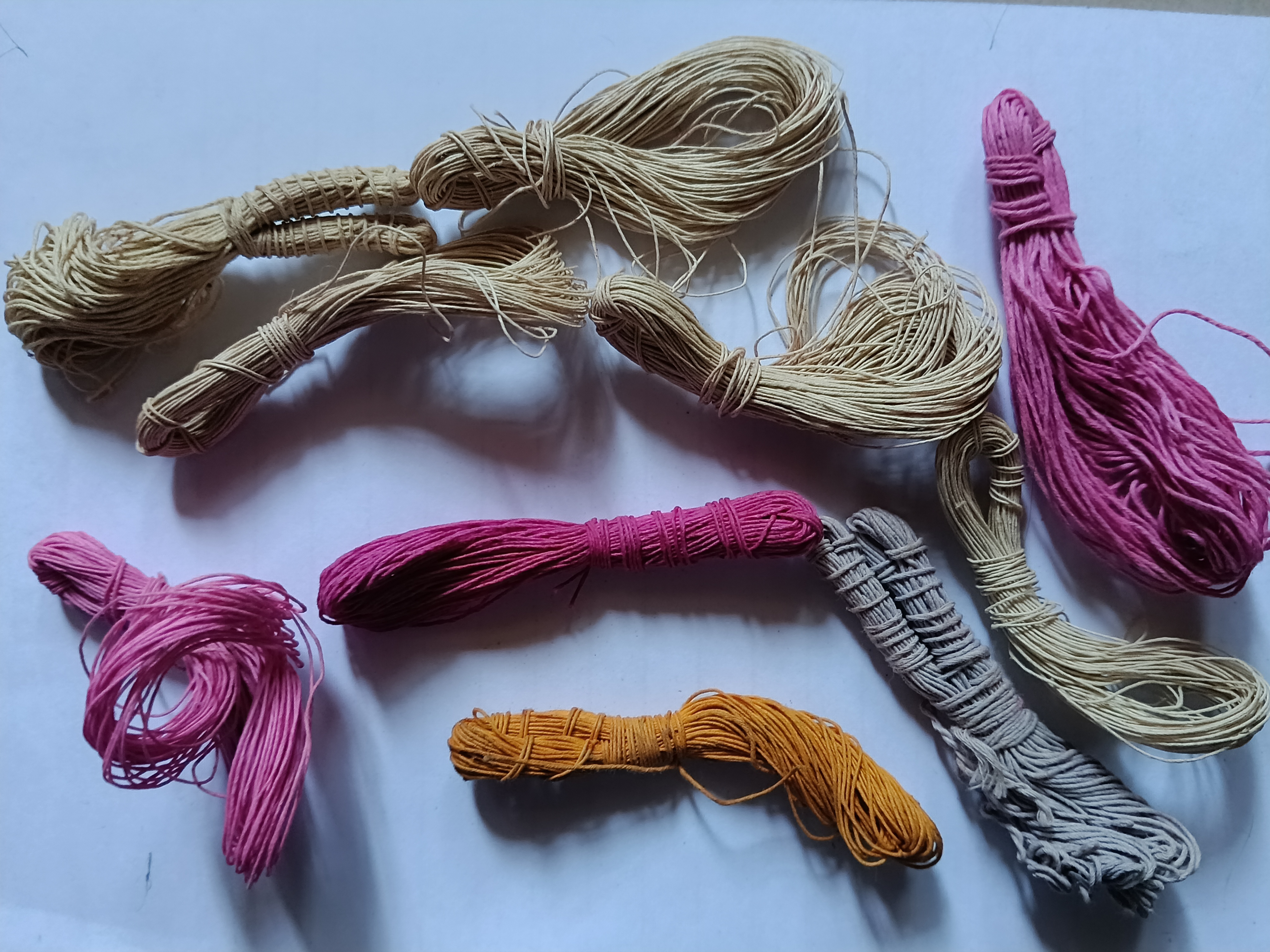
Types of Janeu among the Maithil Brahmins community in the Mithila region of the Indian subcontinent

Janeu (Devanagari: जनेऊ) refers to the sacred thread worn by a Hindu on the occasion of the upanayana sanskar in Hinduism. It is made from cotton fabrics. It has a great respect among Hindu adherents. In the tradition of Hinduism, it symbolises power, knowledge and activism. It is worn by several communities in the Indian subcontinent. The Brahmins, Bhumihars, Kayasthas, Kshatriya, Vaishya and Sonar communities, etc are the major communities who wear the sacred thread or Janeu. A person who wears the sacred thread or "Janeu" is called as Janeudhari.

== Structure ==
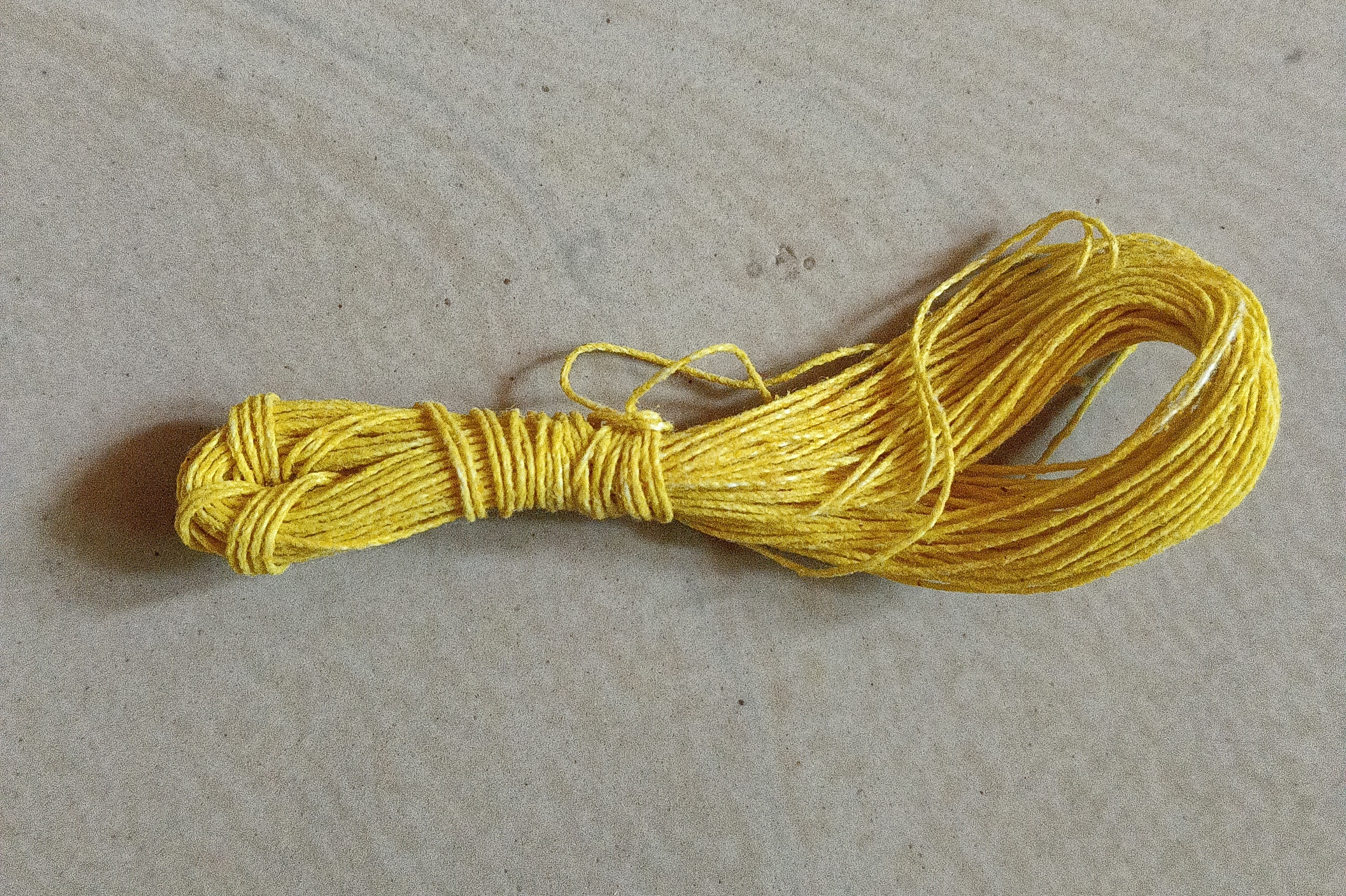
View of yellow colour Janeu in the Maithil Brahmins tradition.

The structure of the Janeu varies from region to region. It is prepared from cotton fibres. First of all a thin thread is made by the cotton fabrics. Using three threads, a trisuta is made. A pair of tirsuta is known as jori.

== Description ==
The Janeu is also known as Yagyopavit. The importance of the sacred thread Janeu is discussed in the Indian philosophical text Brahmo Upanishad. According to the text, the sacred thread Janeu represents that the heart is the abode of the Supreme Brahman in three forms.

"हृदिस्था देवताः सर्वा हृदि प्राणाः प्रतिष्ठिताः।

हृदि प्राणश्च ज्योतिश्च त्रिवृत्सूत्रं च तद्विदुः ।

हृदि चैतन्ये तिष्ठति ॥"

— Verse 4, Brahmopanishad

In the fourth verse of the Brahmopanishad, it is mentioned as Trivrutsutram.

Similarly, in the text Padma Purana, there is mention of the importance of the sacred thread Trivrutsutram (Janeu) in the chapter 51 of the 3rd section known as Swarga Khanda, for the Yagyopavit of Brahmins. It also describes its construction materials cotton or silk thread provided by Lord Brahma to the Brahmins.

कार्पासमुपवीतार्थं निर्मितं ब्रह्मणा पुरा । ब्राह्मणानां त्रिवृत्सूत्रं कौशं वा वस्त्रमेव वा ॥

— Shloka 10, Chapter 51, Section 3, Swarga Khanda, Padma Purana

The devotional hymns of the Hanuman Chalisa composed by the Avadhi poet Tulsi Das, mentions that Lord Hanuman adorns the sacred Janeu of Munj on his shoulder. It is mentioned in fifth chaupai as

हाथ बज्र औ ध्वजा बिराजै। काँधे मूँज जनेऊ साजै॥

— Tulsi Das, Fifth Chaupai, Hanuman Chalisa

The sacred thread Janeu is given to a male child to wear for the first time during his upanayana sanskar. The male child receives the sacred thread Janeu by reciting Gayatri Mantra, which is taught by his father and a priest or his designated acharya for the sanskar rituals. After the upanayana sanskar, the child wears janeu for the entire rest of his life. The Gayatri Mantra to be recited during the receiving of the sacred thread Janeu is

ॐ भूर्भुवः स्वः ।

तत्सवितुर्वरेण्यं । भर्गो देवस्य धीमहि ।

धियो यो नः प्रचोदयात् ॥

— Vishwamitra, Gayatri Mantra, Mandala 3, Rigaveda

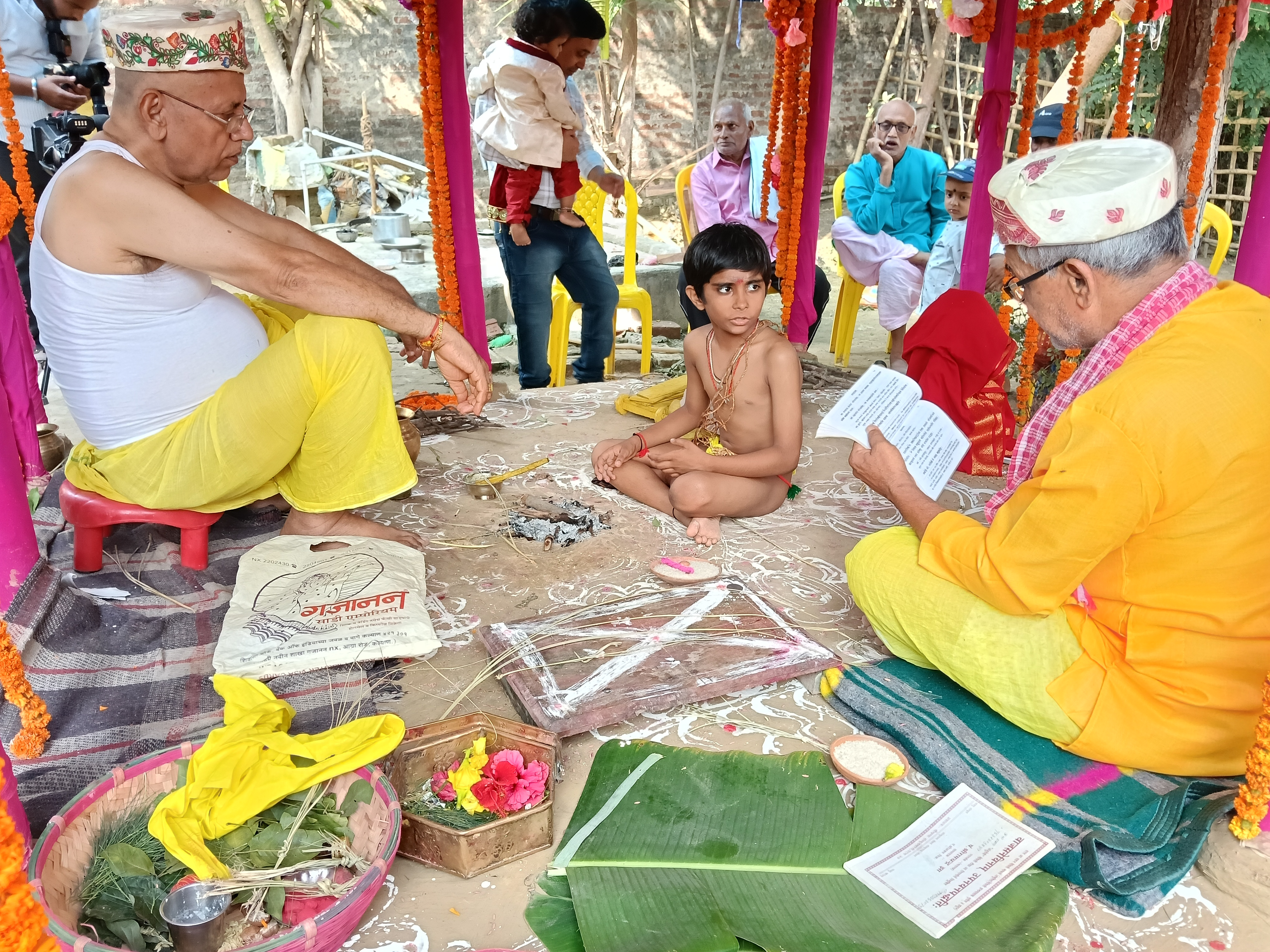
View of a Maithil Upanayan initiating the Janeu Sanskar.

== Beliefs and values ==
In Hinduism, the sacred thread Janeu holds a great value. It is believed as a shield against energies and thoughts of negativity. It helps importing positive energy and focusing on education and towards the growth of spirituality. The ceremony of Janeu Sanskar marks a transition of child from childhood to adolescence. It empowers the child to pursue knowledge, study Vedas and uphold moral values throughout their life. After wearing the sacred thread Janeu, the formal education of the child is initiated at Gurukul by the designated acharya.

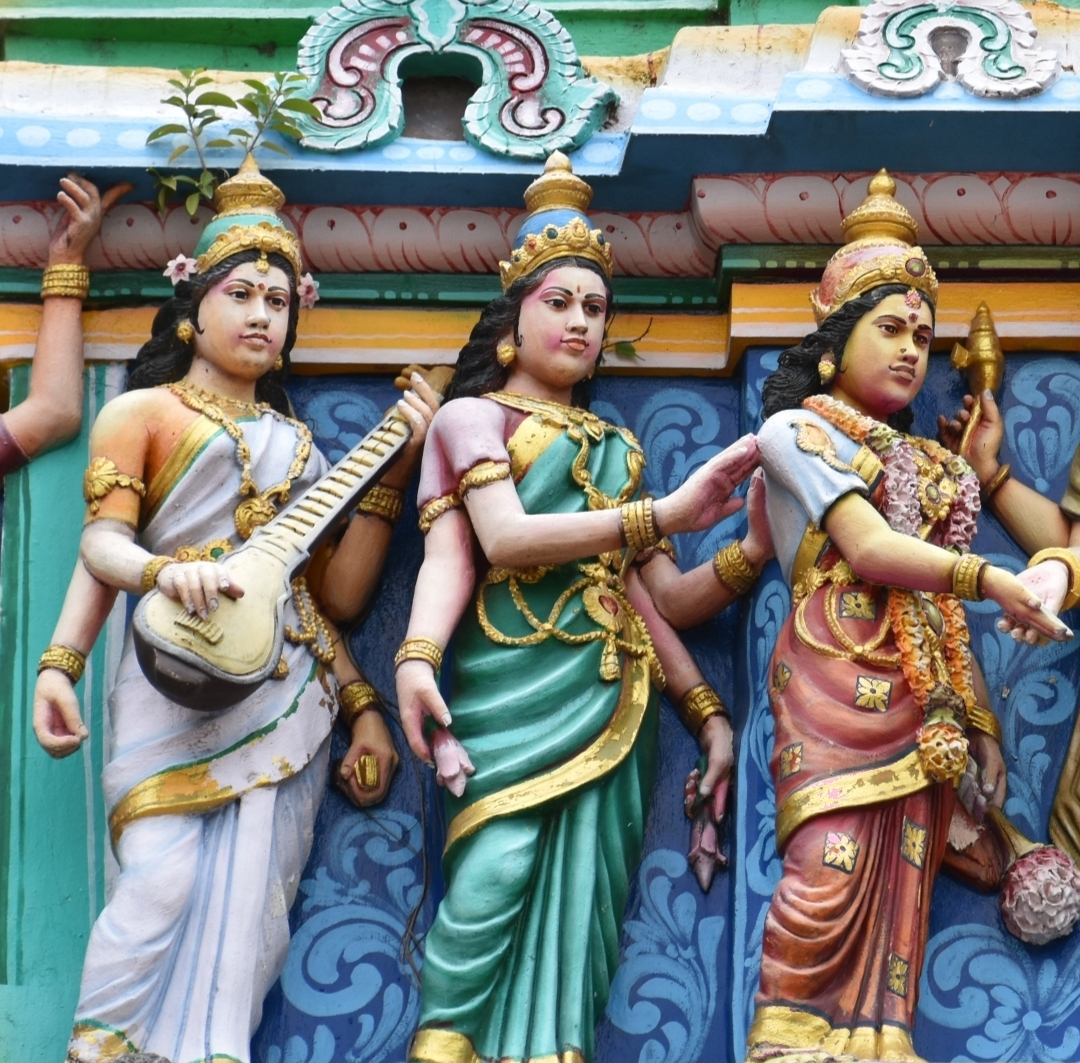
View of Tridevi - Goddess Saraswati (left), Lakshmi (middle) and Parvati (right).

The three threads in the Janeu have symbolic meanings associated with the Tridevi or Trishakti in Hinduism. They symbolize Goddess Saraswati, Goddess Parvati, and Goddess Lakshmi. The three goddesses in the tradition of Sanatana Dharma represent the symbols of knowledge, power and wealth respectively. It is believed that those wearing the sacred thread Janeu are protected from any kind of impurity. The three threads in the Janeu also symbolises Trideva, the Trinity in Hinduism. The Trideva are Lord Brahma, Lord Vishnu and Lord Mahesha. They represent the three forms of the ultimate Brahman. They are Lords of creation, preservation and destruction of the universe respectively. Similarly, the three threads of the Janeu also symbolises Devarin (debt to God), Pitririn (debt to ancestors) and Rishirin (debt to sages). The three threads are also associated with the symbol of the three spiritual qualities Sattva, Raja and Tama in Hinduism.

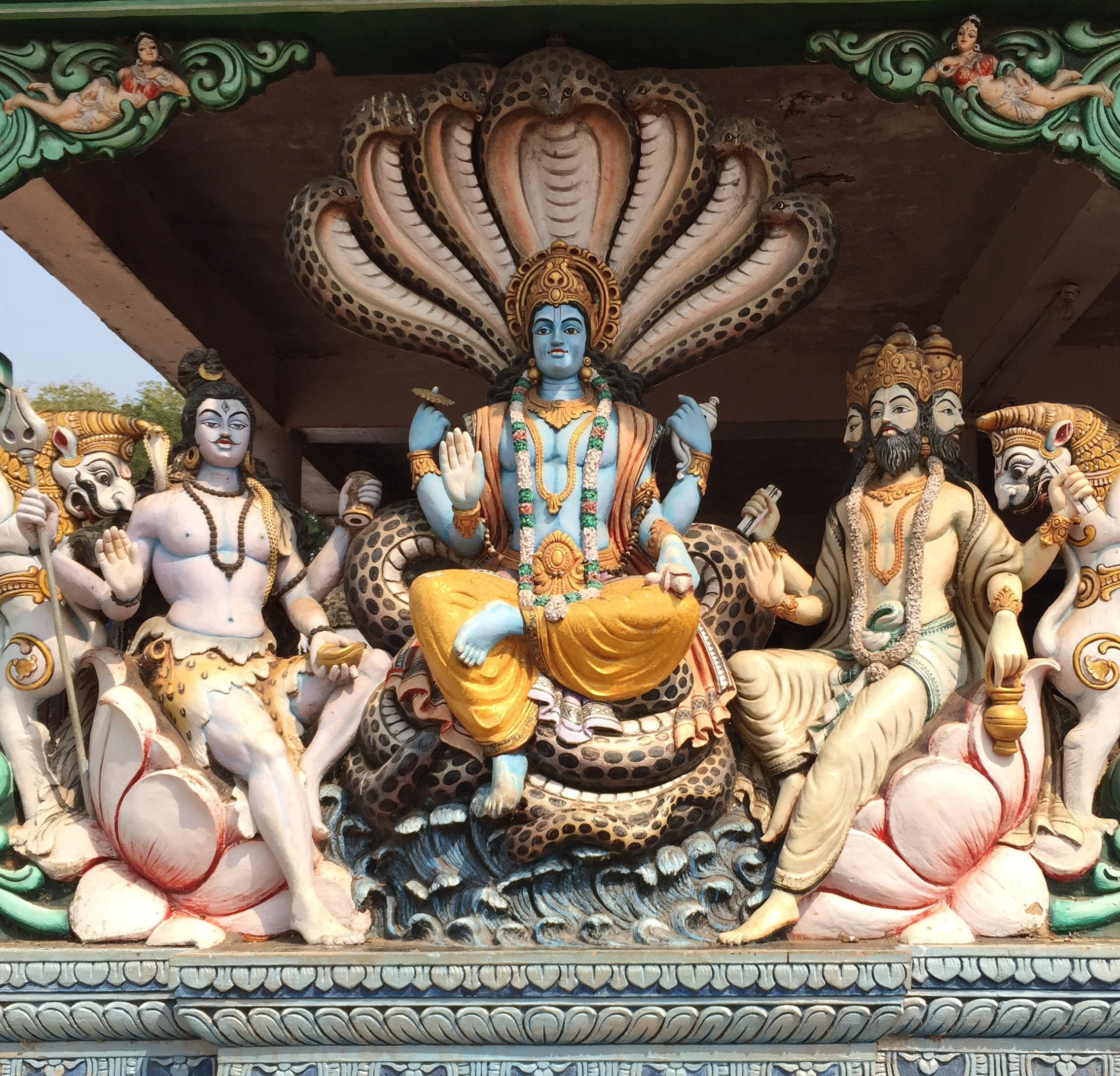
Image of Trideva - Lord Shiva (left), Lord Vishnu (middle), Lord Brahma (right)

== Practices ==
A Janeudhari person wears the sacred thread Janeu in such a manner that it is across the left shoulder and under the right arm. Before wearing a prepared Janeu, it is purified by chanting Vedic mantras according to the Samhita followed by the Janeudhari. In the Mithila region of the Indian subcontinent, the Chhandog and Vajasaneyi Brahmins chant their own mantras according to the Vedic Samhitas followed by them. The Chhandog Brahmins in the region chant the mantra

ॐ यज्ञोपवीतमसि यज्ञस्य त्वोपवीतेनोपनह्यामि ।

— Chhandog Samhita

for the purification of Janeu before wearing it.

Similarly, the Vajasaneyi Brahmins chant the mantra

ॐ यज्ञोपवीतं परमं पवित्रं प्रजापतेर्यत्सहजं पुरस्तात्। आयुष्यमग्रयं प्रतिमुञ्च शुभ्रं यज्ञोपवीतं बलमस्तु तेजः ।।

— Vajasaneyi Samhita
