= Karma Yoga (Bhagavad Gita) =

Third chapter of the Bhagavad Gita

- ← Samkhya Yoga Jnana Karma Sanyasa Yoga →

Information
- Religion: Hinduism
- Author: Traditionally attributed to Vyasa
- Language: Sanskrit
- Verses: 43

The Karma Yoga (Sanskrit: कर्मयोग, romanized: Karmayoga) is the third of the eighteen chapters of the Bhagavad Gita. This chapter comprises a total of 43 shlokas. It is also the 25th chapter of Bhishma Parva, the sixth book of the Mahabharata.

== Etymology ==
The term Karma Yoga is derived from two Sanskrit words: karma and yoga.

In Sanskrit, karma means "action" or "deed" and refers to the actions performed by an individual, including thoughts, words, and physical activities.

Yoga means "union" or "connection" and signifies the process of uniting the individual self (ātman) with the universal consciousness or the divine (Brahman).

When combined, Karma Yoga is understood as the path of selfless action, where an individual performs their duties and responsibilities without attachment to the results, aiming for spiritual growth and union with the divine. It emphasises performing actions as a service or offering to the divine, without seeking personal gain or rewards.

== Overview ==
Verses 1–3: Arjuna expresses confusion about whether Krishna advocates renunciation of actions or active engagement in them. He seeks clarity on which path is superior.

Verses 4–9: Krishna explains that both renunciation and action are essential, but selfless action is superior. He emphasises the importance of performing duties without attachment to the results.

Verses 10–16: Krishna elaborates on the cosmic cycle of creation and the interconnectedness of all beings. He highlights that performing one's duty contributes to societal welfare and upholds the cosmic order.

Verses 17–24: Krishna describes the cycle of nourishment between beings and the cosmos. He advises Arjuna to fulfil his prescribed duties and set an example for others.

Verses 25–30: Krishna explains the threefold desires—sattvic, rajasic, and tamasic—and how they influence human behaviour. He advises transcending these desires to act selflessly.

Verses 31–35: Krishna outlines the qualities necessary for success in Karma Yoga, including determination, control of the mind and senses, and performing actions without attachment.

Verses 36–43: Krishna urges Arjuna to act according to his inherent nature, even if he possesses knowledge. He explains that all actions should be dedicated to the divine and that disciplined action leads to liberation.

This chapter highlights the importance of performing duties selflessly and without attachment while explaining the interconnectedness of all beings within the cosmic order. It provides guidance on cultivating the right qualities for success in the path of Karma Yoga.

== Content ==
Karma Yoga, as elucidated in the Bhagavad Gita, is a profound spiritual path that advocates selfless action and detachment from the fruits of one's deeds. It is both a philosophical approach to life and an art of righteous living, emphasising the performance of one's duties with dedication and devotion, without being influenced by the desire for personal gain or specific outcomes.

The essence of Karma Yoga lies in recognising that action is an inevitable part of life. Individuals are constantly engaged in various activities—physical, mental, and emotional. This path encourages performing these actions with mindfulness, sincerity, and a sense of duty while relinquishing attachment to their results.

Krishna, in the Bhagavad Gita, advises Arjuna to embrace his dharma (duty) as a warrior and fulfil it without hesitation. He emphasises that one must not be driven by desires, success, or failure but rather offer the results to the Divine. By doing so, individuals can free themselves from the bondage of karma and attain liberation.

The practice of Karma Yoga is not about inaction or renunciation but about performing actions as a means of self-purification and spiritual growth. It transforms mundane activities into acts of devotion and service to the Divine. This process enables individuals to let go of selfish desires and egocentric motives, leading to a state of equanimity and inner peace.

Through Karma Yoga, individuals cultivate a sense of universal love and compassion. They understand the interconnectedness of all living beings and recognise that their actions affect the entire cosmos. By acting selflessly and benevolently, they contribute positively to the world, fostering harmony and goodness.

Karma Yoga is a transformative path that elevates individuals from self-centredness to selfless service. By performing actions with dedication, detachment, and devotion, one can attain spiritual growth, liberation from karma, and a deeper understanding of their true nature. This path offers a way to live a purposeful life, making every action an offering to the Divine and a step towards ultimate realisation.

== Themes ==
The practice of Karma Yoga, as described in the Bhagavad Gita, encompasses several essential themes that guide its philosophy and principles. The key themes of Karma Yoga include:

- Selfless Action: The central theme of Karma Yoga is altruism or selfless action. It emphasises performing one's duties and responsibilities without any expectation of personal gain or reward. The focus is on acting for the greater good and offering the results of actions to the Divine.
- Detachment: Karma Yoga teaches detachment from the fruits of one's actions. Practitioners are advised to remain unaffected by success or failure and to act with equanimity. This detachment helps individuals break free from the cycle of desires and karmic consequences.
- Duty and Dharma: Understanding and fulfilling one's duty (dharma) is another significant theme in Karma Yoga. It encourages individuals to recognise their unique roles and responsibilities in life and to carry them out with dedication and sincerity.
- Surrender and Trust: Karma Yoga advocates surrendering the ego and trusting in divine will. By accepting that outcomes are beyond one's control, practitioners learn to rely on a higher power and have faith in the cosmic order.
- Transcending Action: Through Karma Yoga, individuals can elevate ordinary actions to a spiritual level. Mundane tasks become acts of devotion when performed with the right attitude and motive, leading to spiritual growth and inner transformation.
- Universal Love and Compassion: Practising Karma Yoga fosters universal love and compassion towards all beings. By recognising the interconnectedness of all life, practitioners treat others with empathy and kindness.
- Equanimity: Maintaining mental equanimity in the face of success and failure is an important aspect of Karma Yoga. It helps individuals remain calm and balanced, unaffected by external circumstances.
- Liberation and Freedom: Ultimately, the goal of Karma Yoga is liberation (moksha) from the cycle of birth and death. By performing selfless actions and breaking free from the bondage of karma, individuals attain spiritual freedom and the realisation of their true nature.
- Holistic Living: Karma Yoga promotes a holistic approach to life. It encourages individuals to integrate spiritual principles into all aspects of their daily activities, leading to a harmonious and purposeful existence.

The themes of Karma Yoga revolve around selfless action, detachment, duty, surrender, universal love, and liberation. By practising these principles, individuals can lead a life of purpose, spiritual growth, and inner peace.

== Three gunas ==
In Karma Yoga, the three gunas (qualities or attributes) from Hindu philosophy play a significant role. These gunas are fundamental forces that influence human behaviour, thoughts, and actions. The three gunas are:

- Sattva (purity, harmony): Sattva represents the quality of purity, harmony, and balance. When one's actions are guided by Sattva, they perform selfless actions with a sense of duty, devotion, and compassion. Sāttvic actions are characterised by wisdom, clarity, and a focus on the well-being of others. Practising Karma Yoga with a Sāttvic mindset leads to spiritual growth and liberation.
- Rajas (activity, passion): Rajas embodies the quality of activity, passion, and restlessness. When Karma Yoga is influenced by Rajas, individuals may perform actions with a strong desire for personal gain, recognition, or success. There might be attachment to results, leading to fluctuations in motivation and emotional instability.
- Tamas (inertia, ignorance): Tamas represents the quality of inertia, ignorance, and darkness. When Karma Yoga is influenced by Tamas, individuals may neglect their duties, act lazily, or engage in actions that cause harm to others. Tamas can obstruct the path of selfless service and hinder spiritual progress.

In Karma Yoga, the goal is to transcend the influence of the lower gunas (rajas and tamas) and cultivate sattva, the pure and harmonious quality. By performing actions with selflessness, dedication, and detachment, practitioners elevate their actions to a higher level, turning them into a means for spiritual growth and self-realisation.

The teachings of the Bhagavad Gita encourage individuals to be aware of the gunas influencing their actions and strive to purify their thoughts and intentions. By doing so, they can align their Karma Yoga practice with Sattva, leading to a more profound spiritual journey and ultimately attaining liberation.

== See also ==
- Arjuna Vishada Yoga
- Samkhya Yoga
- Jnana-Vijana Yoga
