= Jnana Karma Sanyasa Yoga =

Fourth chapter of the Bhagavad Gita

- ← Karma Yoga Karma Sanyasa Yoga →
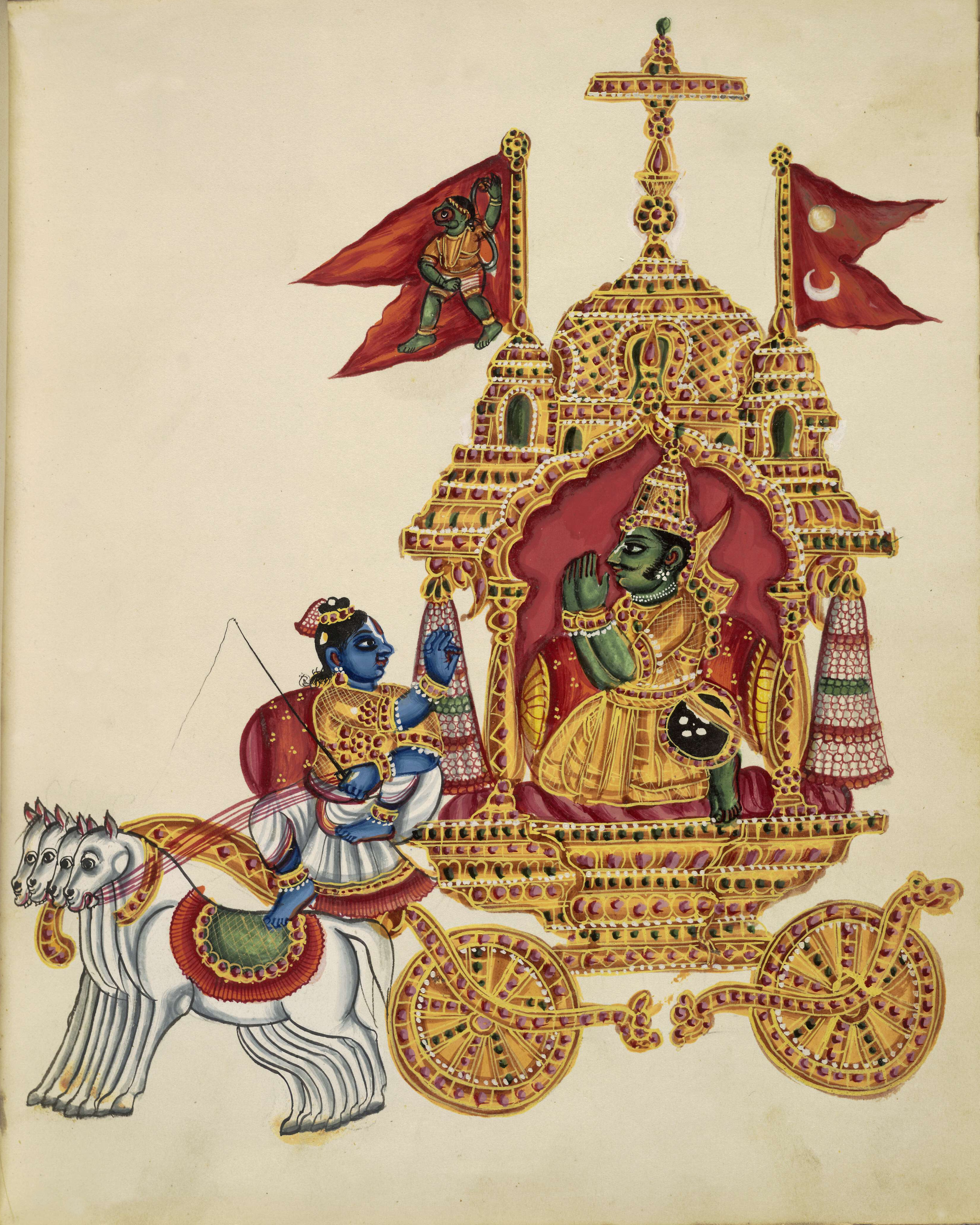
- Painting of Krishna narrating the Bhagavad Gita to Arjuna

Information
- Religion: Hinduism
- Author: Traditionally attributed to Vyasa
- Language: Sanskrit
- Verses: 42

Full text
- The Bhagavad Gita (Arnold translation)/Chapter 4 at English Wikisource

The Jnana Karma Sanyasa Yoga (Sanskrit: ज्ञानकर्मसन्यासयोग, romanized: Jñānakarmasanyāsayoga), also spelled as the Gnana Karma Sanyasa Yoga, is the fourth of the eighteen chapters of the Bhagavad Gita.

== Etymology ==
- Jnana — This refers to knowledge, wisdom, or spiritual wisdom.
- Karma — This signifies action or deeds, often associated with one's duties and responsibilities.
- Sanyasa — This means renunciation or detachment, typically associated with the path of asceticism or renouncing worldly attachments.
- Yoga — This translates to path or discipline, often referring to a spiritual practice or way of life.

== Summary ==
Krishna tells Arjuna that he taught Yoga to Vivasvat, who then passed this knowledge down through a succession of rishis (sages), until it was lost to time. Krishna says he is now giving Arjuna the same ancient lore. Arjuna asks how Krishna could have taught Vivasvat in the distant past, before Krishna's birth, and Krishna explains that he and Arjuna have reincarnated many times, but unlike Arjuna, he remembers his past incarnations. He says that he is the unborn Lord of all creation, but he embodies himself by the power of maya (illusion), taking human form to restore righteousness whenever it declines in the world.

Krishna says that those who perceive his true nature, who are free from fear, attachment, and anger, attain his being and are liberated from further incarnation. He says he has created the four castes, but he is untainted by activity or change. Those who know him are also free from the binding effects of actions. Krishna thus tells Arjuna to act dutifully, as all saints have worked for salvation – the wise renounce attachment to the fruits of action and are always content, free from desire and fear, receiving whatever befalls them with equanimity.

Krishna discusses the various sacrifices in fire one may make to Brahman. While some light literal altar-fires to the gods, others light metaphorical fires of self sacrifice. Some sacrifice their senses, sense objects, or sensual activities. Some offer their wealth, self-discipline, self-study, meditation, or scriptural knowledge. Some govern the breath, or offer life itself. All these burn much karmic sin and go to Brahman, says Krishna, while those who sacrifice nothing gain nothing.

Krishna then extolls the benefit of knowledge, learned from the wise who have realized Truth. He assures Arjuna that such wisdom would burn away his sins even if he were the worst of sinners. Krishna says that he who seeks knowledge will find it in himself in time, and with knowledge, find peace – meanwhile, those who are untaught and doubtful find neither peace nor happiness. Krishna exhorts Arjuna to cut away his doubts with the "sword of wisdom", for he who has vanquished doubt and separated his soul from his activities becomes free.

== Themes ==
This chapter offers insights into the integration of knowledge, action, and renunciation as a means to achieve self-realisation and spiritual fulfillment.

One of the most important doctrines of the Gita introduced in this chapter is the concept of avatāras (avatars, divine incarnations). Krishna identifies himself as an avatar who comes to earth whenever righteousness (dharma) is eclipsed by unrighteousness.

Verse 4.7 of the Bhagavad Gita is as follows:

yadā yadā hi dharmasya glānir bhavati bhārata
abhyutthānam adharmasya tadātmānaṁ sṛijāmyaham
paritrāṇāya sādhūnāṁ vināśhāya cha duṣhkṛitām
dharmasansthāpanārthāya sambhavāmi yuge yuge

O descendant of Bharata, whenever there is a decline of righteousness and an increase in unrighteousness, I manifest myself in this world.

— Bhagavad Gita, 4.7–8

In his interpretation of this chapter, Mahatma Gandhi writes that, as a yogi, Krishna is able to remember his previous incarnations, but Arjuna cannot. Gandhi also asserts that Krishna is using a figure of speech when he implies that he is an avatar – in Gandhi's estimation, any individual of excellence may be perceived to be an avatar. But he still holds verses 4.7–8 as God's assurance to the world that, in evil times, some people will be inspired to act exceptionally and thus be viewed as manifestations of the Divine, as Krishna was.

Krishna is usually considered to be an incarnation of Vishnu, the preserver deity of the Hindu trinity. In this chapter, Vishnu is not mentioned, but Krishna begins to reveal his hidden divine nature, according to Eknath Easwaran. Though Krishna manifests in human form, he tells Arjuna that he is the Lord who dwells in every being, and that by devotion one may unite with him mystically and perceive God in every creature.

Another main theme of this chapter is the role of knowledge in the renunciation of action. Krishna describes a state of inner renunciation where actions become offerings to Brahman or himself. After listing various kinds of sacrifices, he stresses that the offering of knowledge (of the transcendent self) is the highest form of sacrifice: when doubts and ulterior motives involving desired outcomes are dispelled by knowledge of one's true nature, one's actions become pure offerings that cause no bondage.

== See also ==
- Karma Yoga
- Samkhya Yoga
- Arjuna Vishada Yoga
