= Padma Purana =

Medieval era Sanskrit text, one of eighteen major Puranas

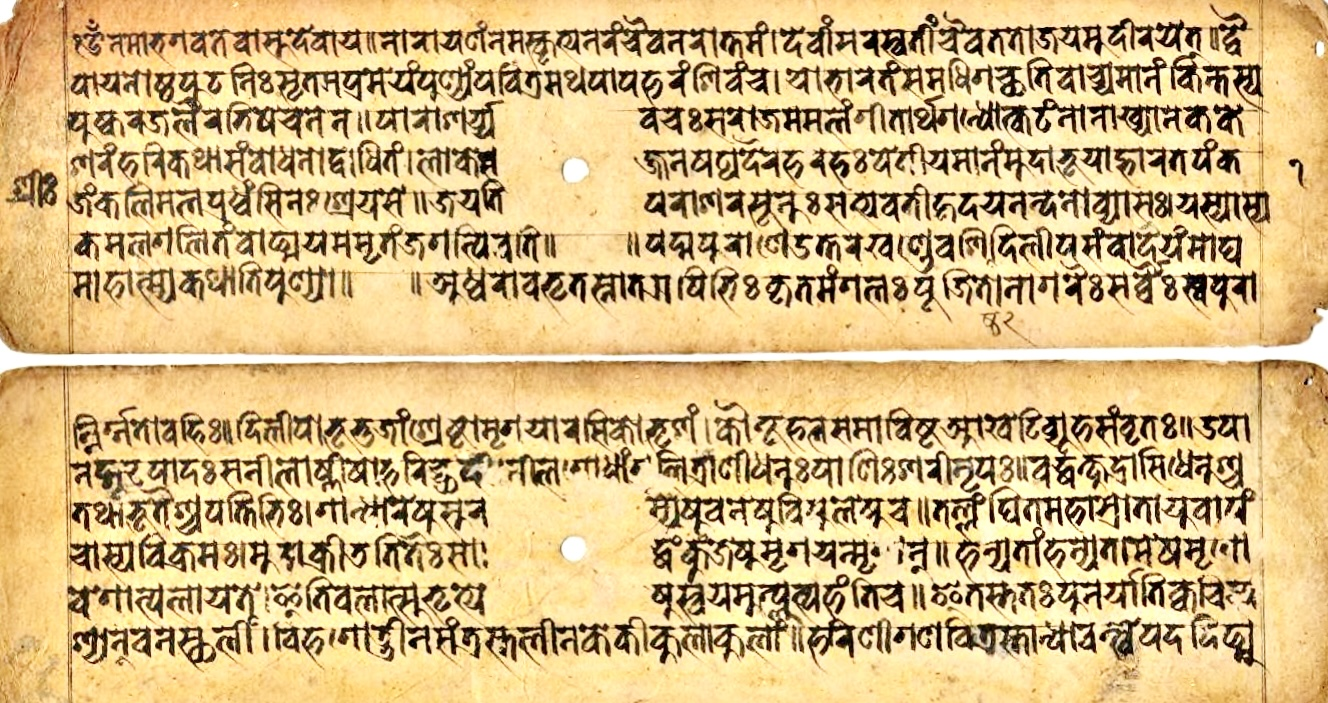
Manuscript of the Uttara Khanda section of Padma Purana in Sanskrit and Newar script

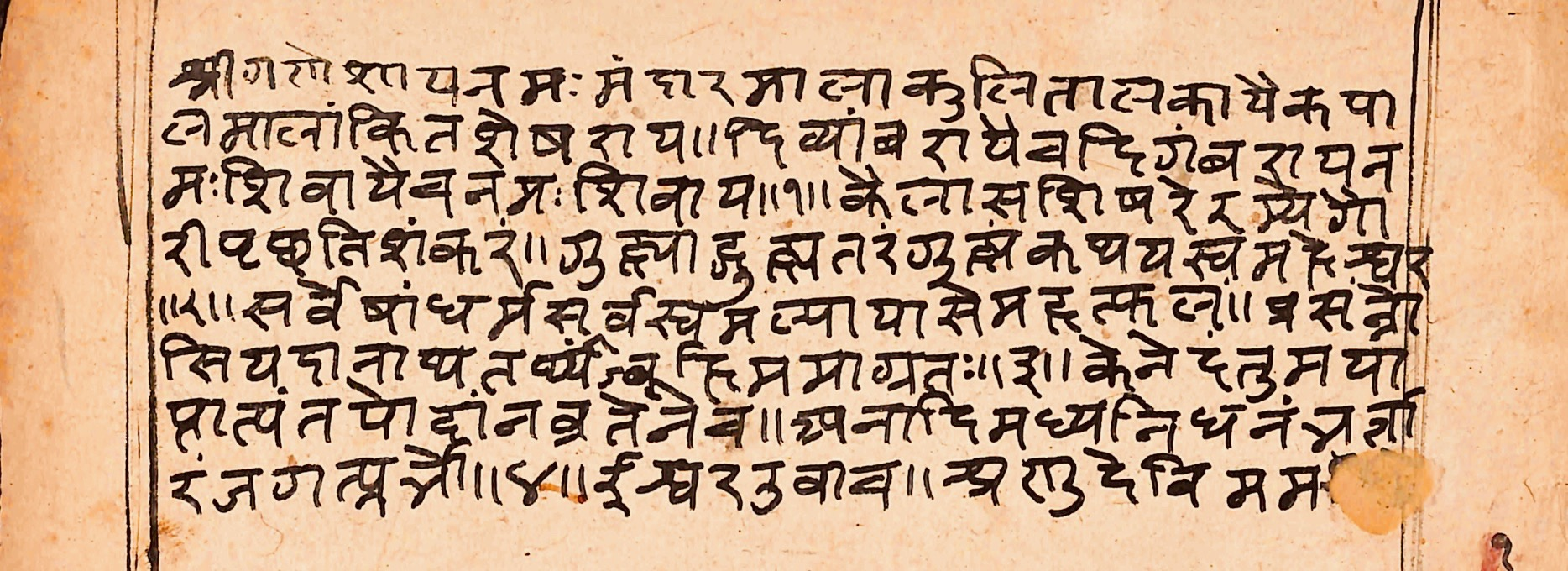
A page from a Padma Purana manuscript (Sanskrit, Devanagari)

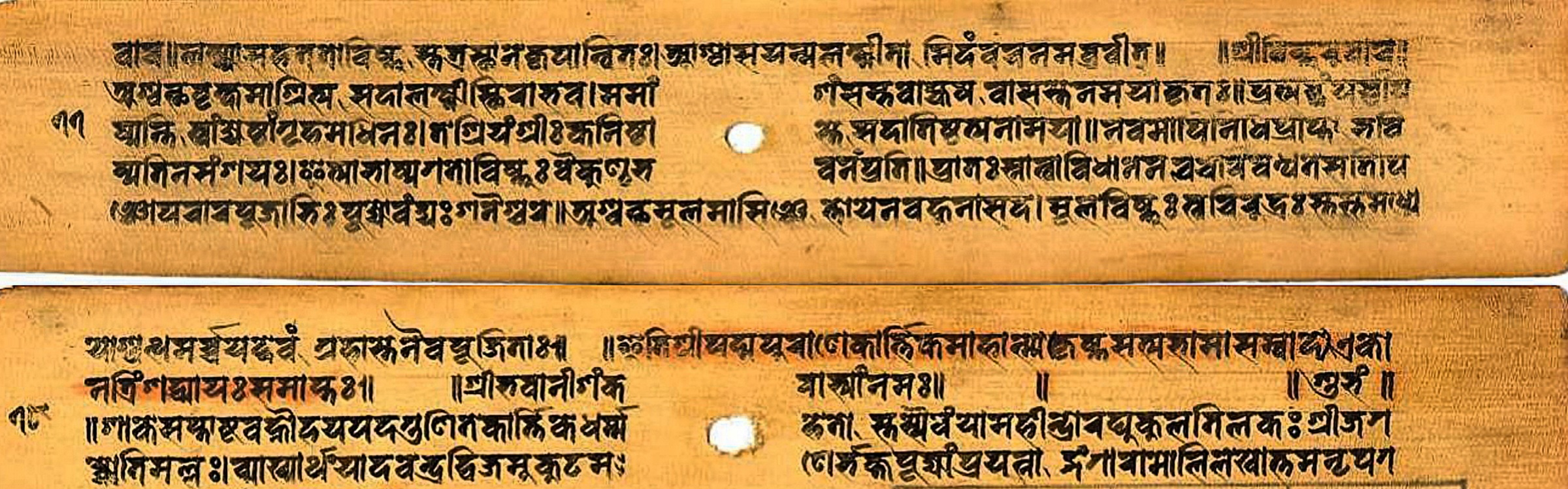
A 17th century palm-leaf manuscript of the Padma Purana from Nepal written in Newar script

The Padma Purana (Sanskrit: पद्मपुराण or पाद्मपुराण, Padma-Purāṇa or Pādma-Purāṇa) is one of the eighteen Major Puranas, a genre of texts in Hinduism. It is an encyclopedic text, named after the lotus in which creator god Brahma appeared, and includes large sections dedicated to Vishnu, as well as significant sections on Shiva and Shakti.

The manuscripts of Padma Purana have survived into the modern era in numerous versions, of which two are major and significantly different, one traced to eastern and the other to western regions of India. It is a voluminous text, claiming to have 55,000 verses, with the actual surviving manuscripts showing about 50,000.

The style of composition and textual arrangement suggest that it is likely a compilation of different parts written in different era by different authors. The text includes sections on cosmology, genealogy, geography, rivers and seasons, temples and pilgrimage to numerous sites in India – notably to the Brahma Temple In Pushkar Rajasthan, versions of story of Rama and Sita different from one found in Valmiki's Ramayana, festivals, glorification mainly of Vishnu but also in parts of Shiva and their worship, discussions on ethics and guest hospitality, Yoga, theosophical discussion on Atman (Soul), Advaita, Moksha and other topics.

There is a Purana-style but entirely different Jainism text also known as Padma Purana, which includes a Jain version of the Ramayana.

== History ==
The Padma Purana, like other Puranas, exists in numerous versions. One major recension, traced to Bengal region, has five khandas (Parts, Books) and an appendix, but has neither been published nor translated. The second major different recension, traced to western region of India, has six khandas, is the adopted and oft-studied version since the colonial British Raj era. The Bengal edition is older. The Bengal edition is notable in that the 39 chapters on Dharma-sastra are missing from the Sristikhanda book, in all versions of its manuscripts.

The composition date of Padma Purana is unknown. Estimates vary between the 4th and 15th century CE. Some parts of the text may be from the 750 to 1000 CE period. The extant manuscripts and ones widely studied, states Wilson, is very likely to have been written or revised well after the 14th century, probably in the 15th or 16th century, because it describes later era major temple sites of south India and sites in the Vijayanagara Empire. No portion of the versions of the Padma Purana available in the 19th century, wrote Wilson, is "probably older than the 12th-century". Asoke Chatterjee, in 1963, suggested that the text may have existed between the 3rd and 4th century CE, but the text was rewritten and greatly expanded over the centuries and through the second half of the 17th century.

Rocher states that the composition date of each Purana remains a contested issue. Dimmitt and van Buitenen state that each of the Puranas manuscripts is encyclopedic in style, and it is difficult to ascertain when, where, why and by whom these were written:

As they exist today, the Puranas are a stratified literature. Each titled work consists of material that has grown by numerous accretions in successive historical eras. Thus, no Purana has a single date of composition. [...] It is as if they were libraries to which new volumes have been continuously added, not necessarily at the end of the shelf, but randomly.

— Cornelia Dimmitt and J. A. B. van Buitenen, Classical Hindu Mythology: A Reader In The Sanskrit Puranas

The Padma Purana categorizes itself as a Sattva Purana (One Which Represents Goodness And Purity).

== Contents ==
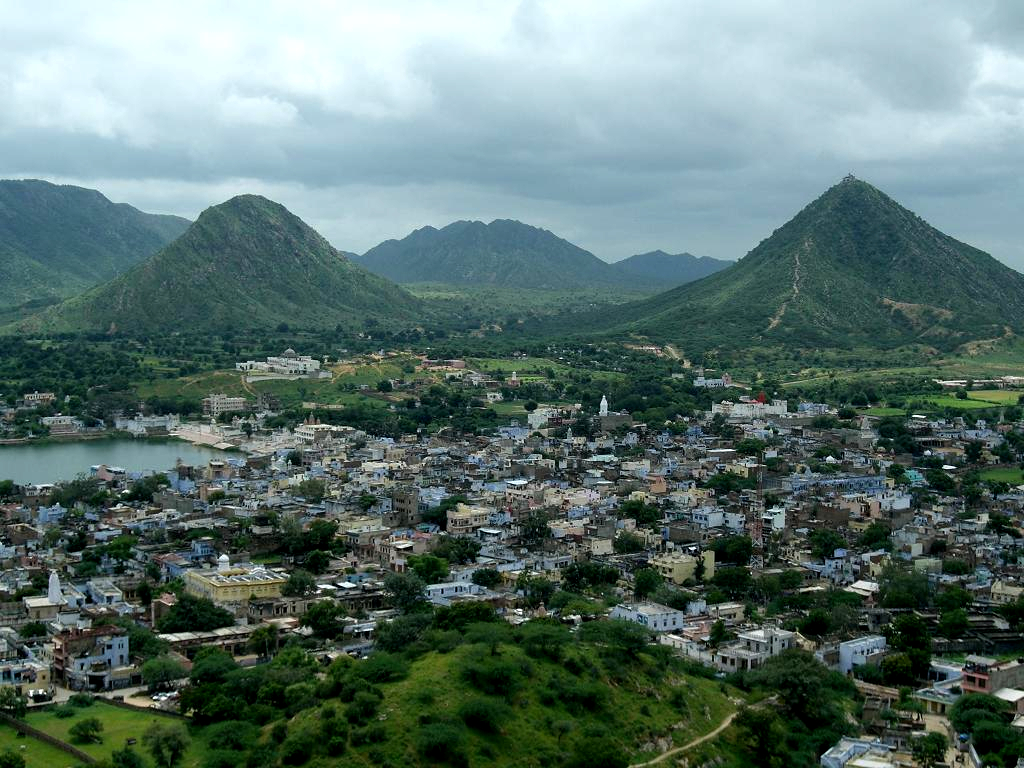
The text describes Pushkar as the place for Pilgrimage.

This text exists in two different versions (Recensions), the Bengal and the west Indian. The Bengal recension consists of Five Khandas (Sections): Shrishti Khanda, Bhumi Khanda, Svarga Khanda, Patala Khanda and Uttara Khanda. The latter recension consists of Six Khandas: Adi Khanda (also known as the Svarga Khanda in some printed editions), Bhumi Khanda, Brahma Khanda, Patala Khanda, Srishti Khanda and Uttara Khanda. The Bhumi Khanda of the Bengal recension contains additional thirteen chapters, while the Patala Khanda of this recension contains thirty-one additional chapters. The Srishti Khanda can be divided into two parts and the second part is not found in the Bengal recension.

The first eighteen chapters of the first part (Khanda) of the text is notable for its description of lake Pushkar, near Ajmer in Rajasthan as a Brahma pilgrimage site, followed by chapters with Vishnu-oriented presentation.

The second part of the text is called Bhumikhanda, and is largely a book of legends woven into a pilgrimage guide. The third part of the text, called Svargakhanda, presents Cosmology, Geography of India, its rivers and description of places. It also describes the importance of the sacred thread Trivrutsutram (Janeu) and its construction materials cotton or silk thread provided by Lord Brahma to Brahmins.

The fourth part of the text, called Brahmakhanda, glorifies Vishnu, discusses seasons, festivals such as one dedicated to Goddess Radha, rituals and Tulasi plant. The fifth part of the text, called Patalakhanda, presents Rama as an Incarnation of Vishnu, Sita as an Incarnation of Lakshmi, and presents a version of their story that is different from one found in the Valmiki's Ramayana. The fifth part also includes chapters where Shiva and Parvati discuss the character of Krishna, as well as significant collection of chapters which glorify Shiva.

The last part, called Uttarakhanda, contains legends and mythology associated with Indian festivals, eighteen chapters called as Gita Mahatmya, followed by chapters of Bhagavata Mahatmya and Shiva Gita, discussion of soul and liberation, quotes from the Upanishads, Yoga and the Advaita Vedanta doctrines. The text, in some versions of the manuscripts, ends with Kriya-Yogasara which is a discussion of ethics and hospitality to guests.

== Other texts with same title ==
Several purana-like texts of other Indian religions such as Jainism and Buddhism are also known as Padma Purana. These include the Padma-Purana (also called Padma-Caritam) by the 7th century Ravisena of the Digambara tradition of Jainism, written in Sanskrit. Other texts with same name include those by (Balabhadrapurana) or Raidhu (15th century), the Padma-Purana of Somadeva (1600), the Padma-Purana of Dharmakirti (1612), the Padma-Purana of Bhattaraka Candrakirti (c. 17th century), and two undated texts by Candrasagara and by Sricandra. These belong to the Apabhramsa genre of Indian literature.
