= Samkhya Yoga (Bhagavad Gita) =

Second chapter of the Bhagavad Gita

- ← Arjuna Vishada-yoga Karma Yoga →
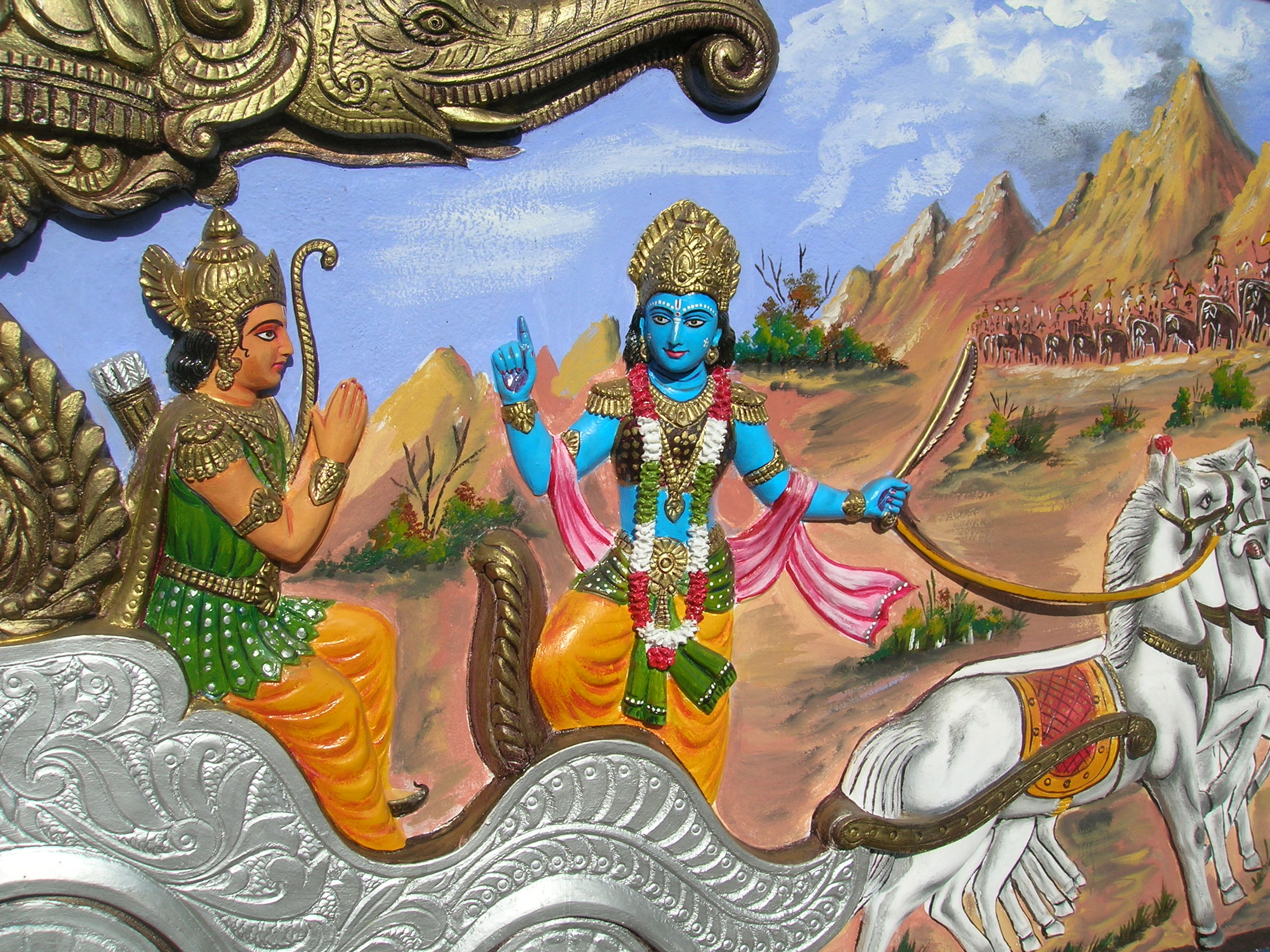
- Depiction of Krishna narrating the Bhagavad Gita to Arjuna

Information
- Religion: Hinduism
- Author: Traditionally attributed to Vyasa
- Language: Sanskrit
- Verses: 72

The Samkhya Yoga (Sanskrit: सांख्ययोग, romanized: Sāṃkhyayoga) is the second of the Bhagavad Gita's eighteen chapters. It has 72 shlokas. The chapter is the 26th of the Bhishma Parva, the sixth book of the Mahabharata.

== Etymology ==
Samkhya refers to the analytical approach of discerning reality through knowledge and understanding. Yoga signifies a path or discipline. In the Bhagavad Gita, Samkhya Yoga refers to the path of knowledge, self-realisation, and understanding the nature of reality. It represents the philosophical and spiritual teachings in that section of the text.

== Overview ==
Shlokas 1-12: Arjuna is confused and morally troubled on the battlefield. Krishna teaches that the soul is eternal and cannot be killed; only the body is perishable. He encourages Arjuna to fulfill his duty as a warrior.

13-30: Krishna explains the nature of the soul, stressing that it is beyond birth and death. He advises Arjuna to rise above attachment and focus on performing his duty selflessly.

31-38: Krishna discusses the concept of dharma (duty), and explains that Arjuna should not be swayed by desire. Doing his duty as a warrior is more important.

39-53: Krishna elaborates on the three gunas (qualities) that influence human behavior: sattva (goodness), rajas (passion), and tamas (ignorance). He emphasizes transcending these gunas to progress spiritually.

54-72: Krishna praises renunciation and self-control, stressing that true wisdom comes from understanding the self (distinct from the body). He urges Arjuna to engage in action without attachment.

== Content ==
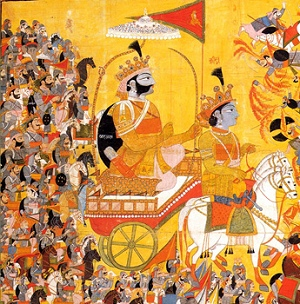
Arjuna on his chariot, with Krishna his charioteer

Krishna imparts wisdom to Arjuna in the Samkhya Yoga, guiding him through his moral and existential dilemmas. The chapter begins with Arjuna expressing confusion and reluctance to engage in battle: a metaphor for life's challenges. Krishna responds by highlighting the impermanence of the physical body and the eternal nature of the soul. He explains that the soul (Atman) is beyond birth and death, and Arjuna should not grieve for physical bodies that will perish.

Krishna introduces the concept of Samkhya (knowledge or wisdom) and encourages Arjuna to cultivate a detached, balanced mindset. He emphasizes that true wisdom involves seeing beyond the dualities of pleasure and pain, success and failure – remaining unaffected by external circumstances.

He discusses the paths to spiritual realization, including karma yoga (the yoga of selfless action) and jnana yoga (the yoga of knowledge). He emphasizes that performing one's duties without attachment to their results is the key to inner peace and spiritual growth.

Krishna addresses Arjuna's doubts about renunciation, explaining that true renunciation is not abandoning action but renouncing attachment and desire for the fruits of action. He teaches that actions performed as an offering to the divine, without selfish motives, lead to liberation. Emphasizing self-control and discipline, he compares the turbulent mind to a wild wind that can be tamed with practice and detachment. By mastering the mind, an individual can maintain equilibrium in the face of challenges.

The chapter concludes with Krishna underscoring the significance of faith and surrender. He encourages Arjuna to surrender his will to the divine and trust in the greater cosmic order. True knowledge, Krishna explains, leads to self-realisation and liberation from the cycle of birth and death.

The Samkhya Yoga is a discourse on the nature of the self, the importance of selfless action, and the path to spiritual enlightenment. Krishna teaches Arjuna to transcend the dualities of life, cultivate detachment and embrace a disciplined, balanced approach to challenges. The chapter lays the foundation for understanding the essence of yoga: the union of the individual soul with the cosmic consciousness.

== Themes ==
The Samkhya Yoga outlines themes providing insights into the nature of reality, human existence, and the path to spiritual enlightenment.

- Self-Knowledge — The importance of understanding one's true nature and distinguishing between the eternal soul (Atman) and the temporary physical body.
- Detachment — The chapter advocates detachment from the material world and urges individuals to perform their duties without being attached to their outcomes.
- Discipline and Focus — Arjuna is advised to focus on his duty as a warrior without getting swayed by emotions, highlighting the significance of discipline and mental focus.
- The Nature of Reality — The distinction between the physical and spiritual realms is explored, emphasizing the imperishable and eternal nature of the soul.
- Renunciation of Actions — The chapter promotes acting selflessly and dedicating the results to a higher purpose, transcending the ego-driven desire for personal gain.
- Intellectual Inquiry – Arjuna's quest for knowledge prompts Krishna to provide philosophical insights, encouraging rational inquiry to gain spiritual wisdom.
- Path to Liberation – TheSamkhya Yoga lays out the path to liberation through knowledge, highlighting the importance of understanding the interconnection of all beings and recognizing the ultimate reality.

These themes guide Arjuna in his journey towards self-realisation, offering teachings on the nature of existence, duty, and the pursuit of spiritual enlightenment.

== Significance ==
The Samkhya Yoga addresses the fundamental themes of duty, selfless action, and the nature of reality. Krishna imparts wisdom to Arjuna, guiding him to rise above his inner conflicts and fulfill his responsibilities. The teachings emphasize the importance of performing one's duty without attachment to the results, the central concept of karma yoga.

Krishna introduces the concept of the eternal soul (Atman) and the temporary nature of the physical body. He explains that the soul is immortal, its essence untouched by birth and death. This lays the groundwork for understanding the Bhagavad Gita's deeper concepts, such as self-realisation.

The Samkhya Yoga also introduces the concept of Samkhya (analysis or discernment). This analytical approach involves distinguishing between the temporary and eternal aspects of existence, leading to an understanding of reality and the path to liberation. It connects Arjuna's initial emotional turmoil and the subsequent philosophical discourse, providing a transition from his initial reluctance to fulfill his duty as a warrior to his readiness to comprehend the deeper truths of existence.

The chapter presents teachings that set the stage for the subsequent chapters. Its emphasis on duty, selfless action, the nature of the soul, and analytical discernment encapsulates the essence of the Bhagavad Gita.

== Legacy ==
Verse 47 of the chapter reads:

Sanskrit

Karmaṇyevādhikāraste mā phaleṣhu kadāchana
mā karmaphalaheturbhūrmā te saṅgo’stvakarmaṇi

Translation:
English

Thy right is to work, but never to its fruits; let not the fruits of action be thy motive, nor let thy attachment be to inaction.

Mahatma Gandhi's interpretation of the Samkhya Yoga revolved around selfless action, non-attachment, and the concept of duty. Gandhi believed that individuals should focus on fulfilling their responsibilities without being attached to the results. This philosophy guided his approach to nonviolent resistance, where actions were taken without the desire for personal gain. Gandhi emphasized the importance of self-discipline and renunciation of material desires, aligning with the Bhagavad Gita's teachings on detachment. The legacy of the Samkhya Yoga lies in his application of these principles to social and political activism, advocating for justice, equality, and freedom through peaceful means. This continues to inspire individuals globally to engage in selfless service and contribute to positive social change.

== See also ==
- Arjuna Vishada-yoga
- Karma Yoga (Bhagavad Gita)
- Samkhya
