= Sattvic diet =

Diet based on foods in yogic and ayurvedic literature

A sattvic diet (sometimes referred to as a yogic diet in modern literature) is a type of plant-based diet within Ayurveda where food is divided into three yogic qualities (guna). In this system of dietary classification, foods that decrease the energy of the body are considered tamasic, while those that increase the energy of the body are considered rajasic.

A sattvic diet shares the qualities of sattva, some of which include "pure, essential, natural, vital, energy-containing, clean, conscious, true, honest, wise". A sattvic diet can also exemplify ahimsa, the principle of not causing harm to other living beings. This is one reason yogis often follow a vegetarian diet.

A sattvic diet is a regimen that places emphasis on seasonal foods, fruits if one has no sugar problems, nuts, seeds, oils, ripe vegetables, legumes, whole grains, and non-meat based proteins. Dairy products are recommended when the cow is fed and milked appropriately.

In ancient and medieval Yoga literature, the concept discussed is Mitahara, which literally means "moderation in eating". A sattvic diet is one type of treatment recommended in Ayurvedic literature.

== Etymology ==
Sattvic is derived from sattva (सत्त्व) which is a Sanskrit word. Sattva is a complex concept in Indian philosophy, used in many contexts, and it means one that is "pure, essence, nature, vital, energy, clean, conscious, strong, courage, true, honest, wise, rudiment of life".

Sattva is one of three gunas (quality, peculiarity, tendency, attribute, property). The other two qualities are considered to be rajas (agitated, passionate, moving, emotional, trendy) and tamas (dark, destructive, spoiled, ignorant, stale, inertia, unripe, unnatural, weak, unclean). The concept that contrasts with and is opposed to sattva is Tamas.

A sattvic diet is thus meant to include food and eating habit that is "pure, essential, natural, vital, energy-giving, clean, conscious, true, honest, wise".

== Ancient literature ==
Eating agreeable (sattvic) food and eating in moderation have been emphasized throughout ancient Indian literature. For example, the c. 5th-century Tamil poet-philosopher Valluvar insists this in the 95th chapter of his work, the Tirukkural. He hints, "Assured of digestion and truly hungry, eat with care agreeable food" (verse 944) and "Agreeable food in moderation ensures absence of pain" (verse 945).

Yoga includes recommendations on eating habits. Both the Śāṇḍilya Upanishad and Svātmārāma, an Indian yogi who lived during the 15th century CE, state that Mitahara (eating in moderation) is an important part of yoga practice. It is one of the Yamas (virtuous self restraints).

In Yoga diet context, the virtue of Mitahara is one where the yogi is aware of the quantity and quality of food and drinks he or she consumes, takes neither too much nor too little, and suits it to one's health condition and needs.

The application of sattva and tamas concepts to food is a later and relatively new extension to the Mitahara virtue in Yoga literature. Verses 1.57 through 1.63 of Hatha Yoga Pradipika suggest that taste cravings should not drive one's eating habits; rather, the best diet is one that is tasty, nutritious and likable, as well as sufficient to meet the needs of one's body. It recommends that one must "eat only when one feels hungry" and "neither overeat nor eat to completely fill the capacity of one’s stomach; rather leave a quarter portion empty and fill three quarters with quality food and fresh water". The Hathayoga Pradipika suggests ‘‘mitahara’’ regimen of a yogi avoids foods with excessive amounts of sour, salt, bitterness, oil, spice burn, unripe vegetables, fermented foods or alcohol. The practice of Mitahara, in Hathayoga Pradipika, includes avoiding stale, impure and tamasic foods, and consuming moderate amounts of fresh, vital and sattvic foods.

In the Bhagavad Gita, Krishna describes sattvic foods such as vegetables, beans, fresh milk, and fruits.

== Sattvic foods ==
According to ayurveda, sattvic, rajasic, and tamasic foods consist of some combination of any of the five basic elements: prithvi (earth), jala (water), teja (fire), vayu (air), and akash (ether). In addition to being vegetarian, sattvic food is also fresh and organic. Examples of sattvic foods include legumes, vegetables, nuts, seed, fresh fruits, and organic dairy.

Vegetarianism is not the only basis for sattvic food, but there is also an emphasis on foods with prana or life. Foods with prana would include fresh produce and fruits. Fresh fruits are preferred to frozen or preserved in a sattvic diet.

Nuts that may be considered a part of a sattvic diet include raw organic almonds, cashews, and pistachios. Seeds that may be considered a part of a sattvic diet include sunflower and pumpkin seeds.

== Rajasic (stimulant) foods ==
Rajasic food is defined as food that is spicy, hot, fried, or acidic. Bitter and salty food is also considered rajasic. According to ayurveda, consumption of rajasic food is believed to cause sadness, misery, or ailment. Junk and preserved foods are often categorized as rajasic. These types of foods are believed to incite aggression and combativeness.

== Tamasic (sedative) foods ==
Tamasic food is defined as food that is contaminated, rotten, rancid, old, and aged or fermented. In ayurveda, consumption of tamasic foods is believed to deplete one's bodily strength. Examples of tamasic foods include meat, alcohol, onion, garlic, processed food, and deep fried foods.

== Incompatible foods ==
Incompatible foods (viruddha) are considered to be a cause of many diseases. In the Charaka Samhita, a list of food combinations considered incompatible in the sattvic system is given. P.V. Sharma states that such incompatibilities may not have influence on a person who is strong, exercises sufficiently, and has a good digestive system.

Examples of combinations that are considered incompatible include:

- Fish with milk products (traditionally believed to produce toxins)
- Meat with milk products
- Sour food or sour fruit with milk products
- Leafy vegetables with milk products
- Milk pudding or sweet pudding with rice
- Mustard oil and curcuma (turmeric)

== See also ==
- Ayurveda
- Buddhist vegetarianism
- Diet in Hinduism
- Jain (Satvika)
- Lacto vegetarianism
- Ital
- Kosher
- Halal
