= Chhandog =

Division of Maithil Brahmins

Chhandog (Sanskrit: छन्दोग) or Chandog or Chandogic or Chandogya is a division or a group of Maithil Brahmins on the basis of the Vedic Samhita followed in the Mithila region of the Indian subcontinent. It is one the two major divisions of the Maithil Brahmins community. According to Vedic Samhitas, the Maithil Brahmins are divided into two divisions. They are Chhandog Brahmins and Vajasaneyi Brahmins. The Chhandog Brahmins are also known as Samavedic Brahmins. They are traditionally the followers of Kauthuma Shakha. They follow Kauthuma Samhita for their rituals. Since they follow the Kauthuma Sakha of Samaveda, they are also known as Kauthumashakhiya.

Memorial statue of Gautama Rishi at Uchchaith, the composer of Chhandog Samhita

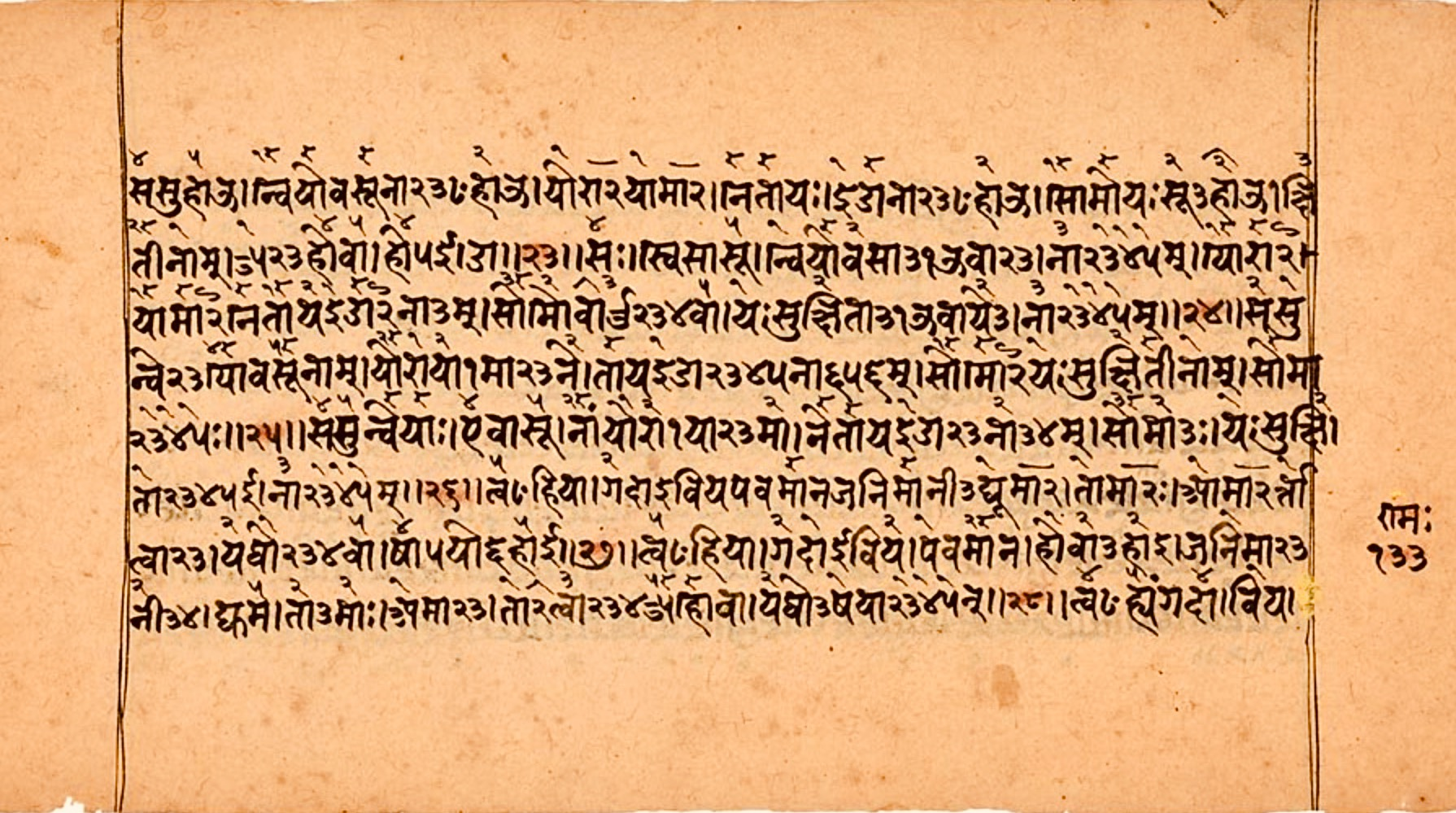
Image of a page of the copy of the 1672 CE manuscript on paper of the Kauthuma Samhita followed by Chhandog Brahmins

The mantra defining the Chhandog Brahmins is,

छन्दांसि येऽत्र गायन्ति छन्दोगास्ते प्रकीर्त्तिताः। सामवेदिषु रूढोऽयं जातः शब्दः प्रयोगतः ॥

— Chandogya Upanishad

The translation of the verse is "Those who sing all types of these Chhandas are called Chhandogas, which is why primarily the followers of the Samaveda sing the Chhandas of the Vedas. Therefore, the term Chhandog is commonly associated with the Samaveda. Some scholars also believe that the word Chhandas itself can refer to the Samaveda. Hence, the Chhandogas are also called Samavedins (Samavedic)."

== History ==
The history of the Chhandog Brahmins can be traced since the period of the King Janaka in Mithila. The Maithil sage Gautama was the Kulguru of the King Janaka. He made a significant contribution to the emergence of the Samaveda. Since the verses of the Samaveda are chanted in Chhand, therefore it is also called as Chhandog.

In the later period, Yajnavalkya became the Kulguru of the King Janaka. His ashram was also near the Gautam Ashram in Mithila. He founded Shukla Yajurveda. The Samhita of the Shukla Yajurveda was called as Vajasaneyi Samhita. A large number of Brahmins in Mithila at that time period started following the Vedic sage Yajnavalkya. They started following Vajasaneyi Samhita for their rituals. As the follower of Vajasaneyi Samhita, they were called Vajasaneyi Brahmins.

Even a large number of Maithil Brahmins became Vajasaneyi Brahmins, a significant number of Maithil Brahmins continued following Samaveda till now. That is why around twenty-five percent of Maithil Brahmins are still followers of the Samaveda Samhita, and are called Chandogas.

== Rituals and practices ==
The mantra for wearing the sacred thread Janeu by the Chhandog Brahmins is

ॐ यज्ञोपवीतमसि यज्ञस्य त्वोपवीतेनोपनह्यामि ।

— Yagyopavit Mantra (Janeu Mantra), Chhandog Samhita

The janeu of Chhandog Brahmin has 3 paravals. The term Paravals means number of knots given in a new Janeu while preparing it to wear. These three paravals represent the three pravaras of the Shandilya gotra. They are Asita, Devala and Shandilya. In the branch of the Chhandog Brahmins, there is only one Shandilya gotra. This gotra has three pravaras, so the other epithet name of Chhandog is Treepravara.

The Upanayana sanskar of a Chhandog Brahmin in the Mithila region is conducted according to the ceremony of the Maithil Upanayan and its rituals are performed according to the guidelines of the text Chhandogaanaam Upanayanpadhti.

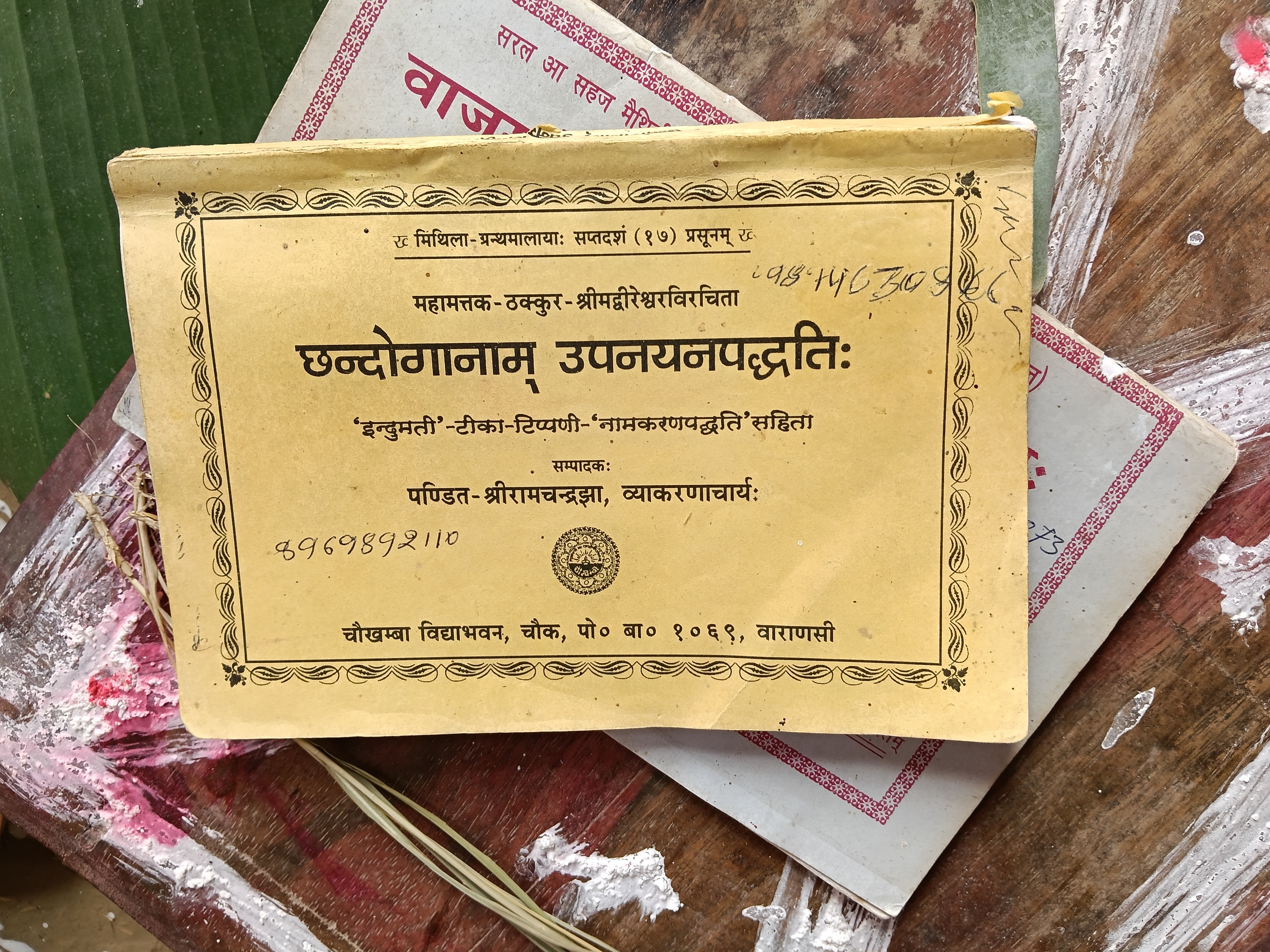
Print version of the Text for Chhandogaanaam Upanayanpadhti

In ancient times, after Upanayana sanskar the Brahmin had to live at the Ashram of the Gurukul of his acharya for minimum 12 years to study Vedas. The young Brahmin was allowed for Vivah Sanskar (marriage) only after the completion of 12 years from the upanayan sanskar ceremony. In this time period of 12 years, the young Brahmin had to learn scriptures, Vedas, social studies, and the texts of the curriculum at Gurukul, etc. The Vivah Sanskar of the Chhandog Brahmin is performed according to the rituals guided by Chhandogaanam Vivah Paddhati.
