= Vajasaneyi Brahmin =

Major division of Maithil Brahmins

Vajasaneyi (Sanskrit: वाजसनेयि) also known as Bachasnai is a major division of Maithil Brahmins in the Mithila region of the Indian subcontinent. It is one of the two major divisions of the Maithil Brahmins community. This division of Maithil Brahmins community started after the foundation of Shukla Yajurveda by the renowned Vedic sage Yajnavalkya in the ancient Mithila Kingdom. Vajasaneyi Brahmins are the followers of the Madhyandini Shakha of Yajurveda. The branch of Vedic literature founded by the sage Yajnavalkya is also called as Vajasaneyi school. The Samhita of this school is known as Vajasaneyi Samhita. Since the Vajasaneyi Brahmins are followers of Yajurveda, so they are also known as Yajurvedic Brahmins.

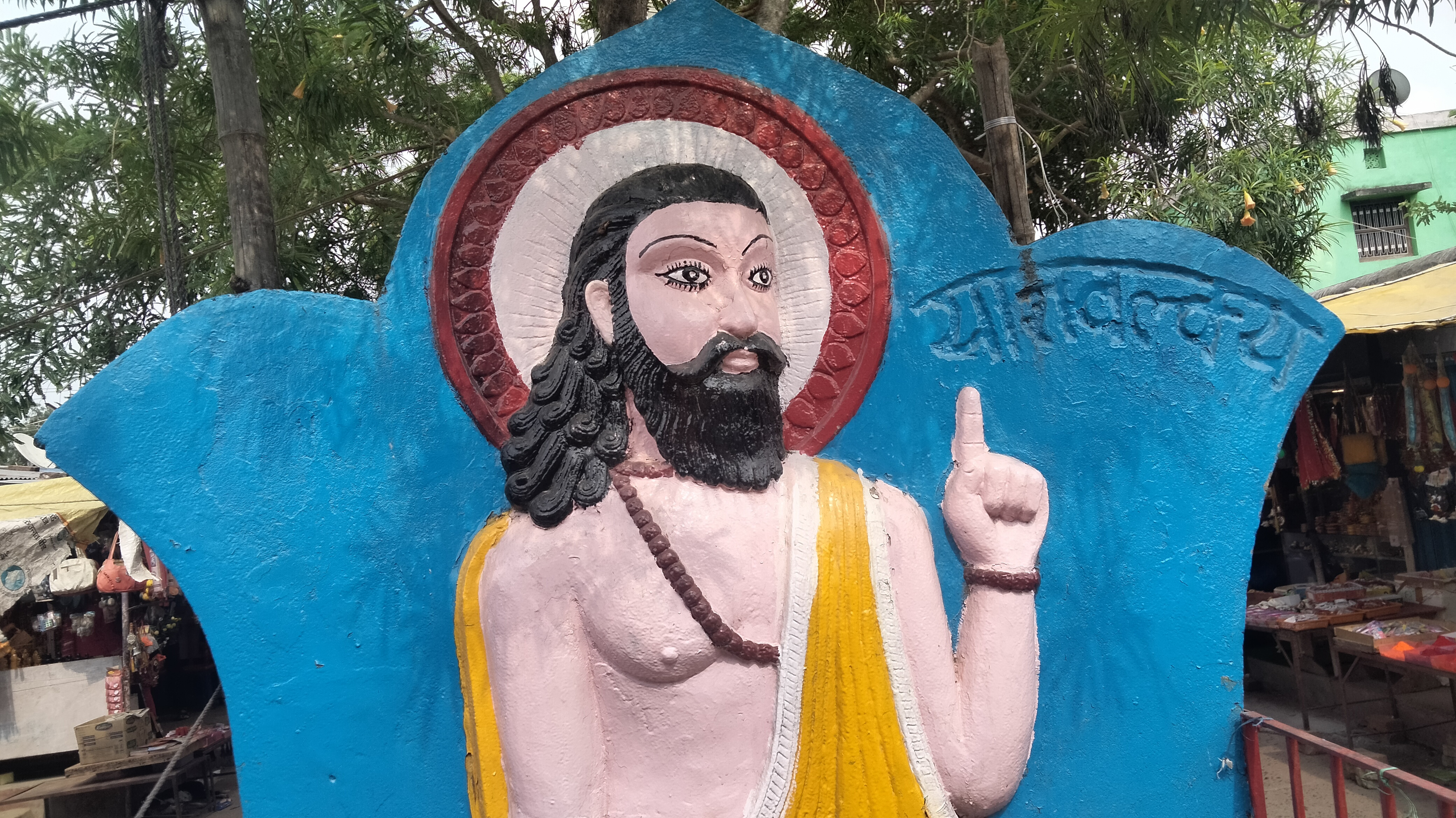
Statue of Yajnavalkya (the founder of the branch Vajasaneyi Brahmin) at Uchchaith.

== Etymology ==
The term Vajasaneyi is associated with the Vedic sage Yajnavalkya. The surname of the Vedic sage was Vajasaneyi. Some times Yajnavalkya is also called as Vajasaneyi. Therefore, the Maithil Brahmins following the branch founded by Yajnavalkya is known as Vajasaneyi Brahmins.

== Description ==
The community of Maithil Brahmins are divided into two major branches on the basis of Vedic Samhitas. They are Chhandog and Vajasaneyi. Chhandog is the early branch of Maithil Brahmins initiated from the foundation of Samaveda Samhita in Mithila by the Vedic sage Gautama and Vajasaneyi is the later branch of the Maithil Brahmins community started after the foundation of Shukla Yajurveda in Mithila by the sage Yajnavalkya. The Vedic sage Yajnavalkya was the Kulguru of the King Kriti Janaka in Mithila.

The Vedic sage Yajnavalkya received the knowledge of Shukla Yajurveda from Lord Suryanarayana. Yajnavalkya had major fifteen disciples. He divided Shukla Yajurveda into fifteen parts and distributed these parts to his fifteen disciples. These fifteen disciples established fifteen group of Brahmins. They were called as Vājasaneyas or Vājasaneyins.

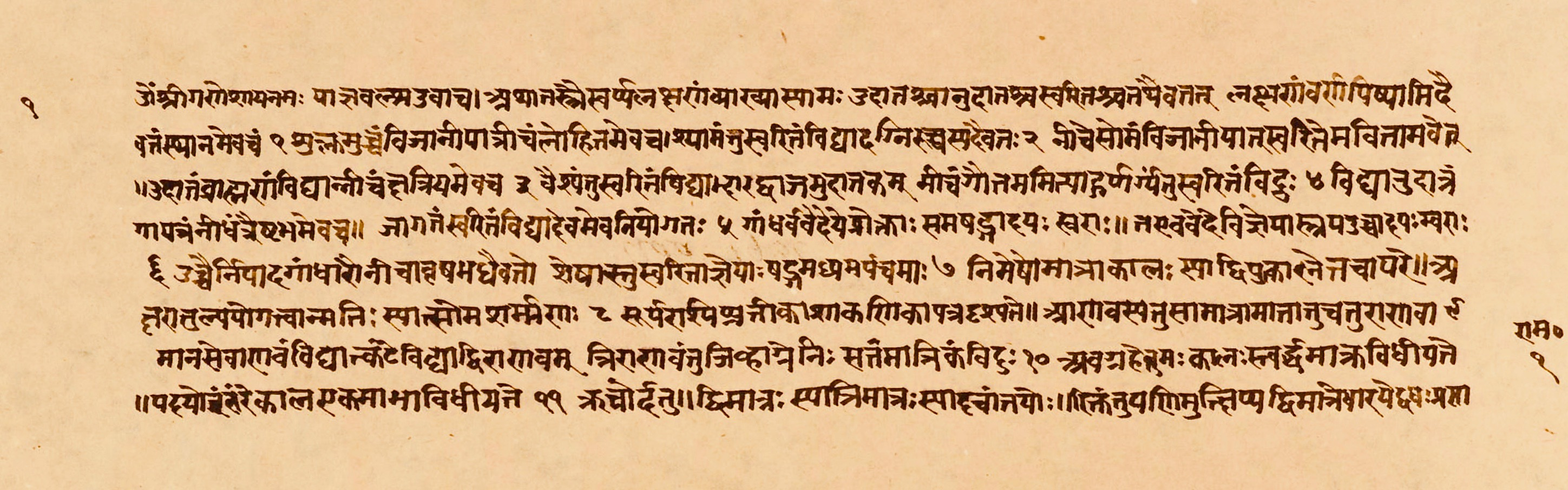
1877 CE manuscript copy of ancient Yajnavalkya Shiksha also known as Vajasaneyi Shiksa or Vedic Traisvarya Laksana. Text of Vedanga at Benares Sanskrit College in Devanagari script of Sanskrit.

== Rituals and practices ==
The community of Vajasaneyi Brahmins has its own texts for rituals, practices, marriage and Upanayan, etc. The text related to marriage is known as Vajsanehi Vivah Samhita which translates to Vajasaneyi Marriage Code. Its 17th century original manuscript is preserved at Bhaktapur near the city of Kathmandu in Nepal. The mantra for wearing the sacred thread Janeu by Vajasaneyi Brahmins is

ॐ यज्ञोपवीतं परमं पवित्रं प्रजापतेर्यत्सहजं पुरस्तात्। आयुष्यमग्रयं प्रतिमुञ्च शुभ्रं यज्ञोपवीतं बलमस्तु तेजः ।।

— Yagyopavit Mantra (Janeu Mantra), Vajasaneyi Samhita

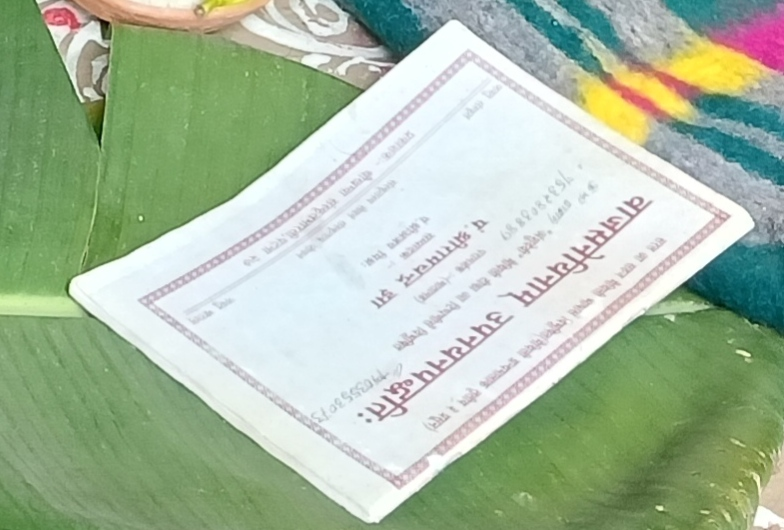
Print version of the text Vajasaneyinaam Upanayanpadhti for Upanayana rituals of Vajasaneyi Brahmins
