= Arjuna Vishada-yoga =

Chapter 1 of the Bhagavad Gita

Arjuna Vishada Yoga
- Samkhya Yoga →
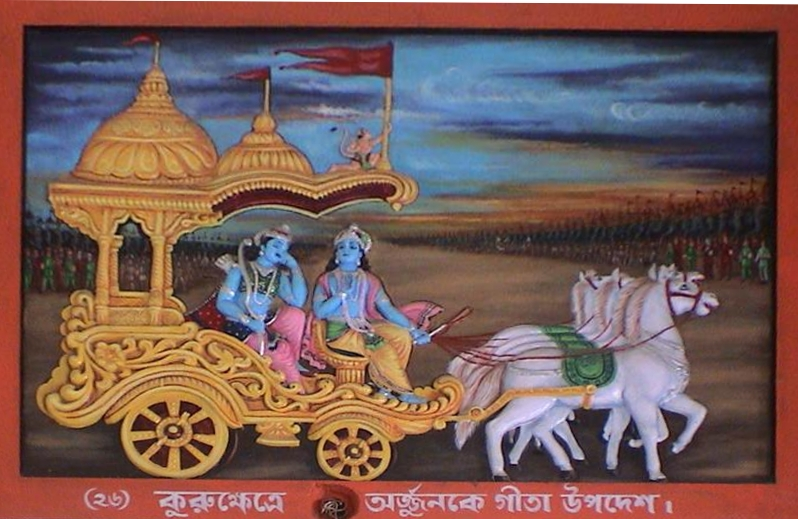
- Depiction of Arjuna in dilemma in the battlefield

Information
- Religion: Hinduism
- Author: Traditionally attributed to Vyasa
- Language: Sanskrit
- Verses: 47

The Arjuna Vishada-yoga (Sanskrit: अर्जुनविषादयोग, romanized: Arjuna Viṣāda-yōga) is the first of the eighteen chapters of the Bhagavad Gita. The chapter has a total of 47 shlokas. The chapter is the 23rd chapter of Bhishma Parva, the sixth book of the Mahabharata.

== Etymology ==
Arjuna refers to the third Pandava prince. Vishada-yoga is translated as despondency or dejection.

== Overview ==
1 — Dhritarashtra inquires from Sanjaya about the events on the battlefield of Kurukshetra. He is curious about the activities of his sons and the Pandavas.

2-3 — Sanjaya describes the scene of the battlefield where both armies are arrayed for battle. He mentions the eagerness of Duryodhana to observe the formation of the Pandavas.

4-7 — Duryodhana's teacher, Drona, points out the strength of the Pandava army and its impressive formations. He also highlights some of the mighty warriors among the Pandavas.

8-9 — Duryodhana's teacher and Bhishma, further praises the Pandava army's arrangement. He compares their formation to a powerful vyuha (military formation).

10-18 — Various warriors from both sides blow their conch shells, creating a tumultuous noise that reverberates across the battlefield. Arjuna's conch blowing is particularly resonant and creates fear among the Kaurava forces.

19-28 — Arjuna, seeing his own kinsmen and friends assembled on both sides of the battlefield, is struck with deep sorrow and moral conflict. He becomes overwhelmed with compassion and grief.

29-30 — Arjuna's mind is filled with confusion and despair. He is unsure about the right course of action and decides not to fight. He lays down his bow and arrows.

31-32 — Arjuna expresses his internal turmoil to Krishna, his charioteer, saying he cannot carry out the act of killing his own relatives. He anticipates the destruction of family values and righteousness due to the war.

33-35 — Arjuna believes that it's better to beg for alms than to kill his own kinsmen. He states that he would rather see the opposing warriors kill him unarmed than to kill them and attain tainted wealth.

36-37 — Arjuna's reasoning continues as he envisions the negative consequences of the war, including the disruption of society and the influence of irreligion.

38-43 — Arjuna shares his perception of how desire and greed for power have driven his family to this point. He predicts that such actions will lead to the degradation of the family lineage.

44-46 — Arjuna concludes his inner turmoil by admitting that he is unable to determine the right path. He acknowledges his confusion and asks Krishna for guidance.

47 — With these words, Arjuna surrenders his will to Krishna, acknowledging Krishna as his guru (spiritual guide). He awaits Krishna's instruction on how to proceed.

This chapter sets the stage for the teachings of Krishna in the subsequent chapters of the Bhagavad Gita.

== Content ==
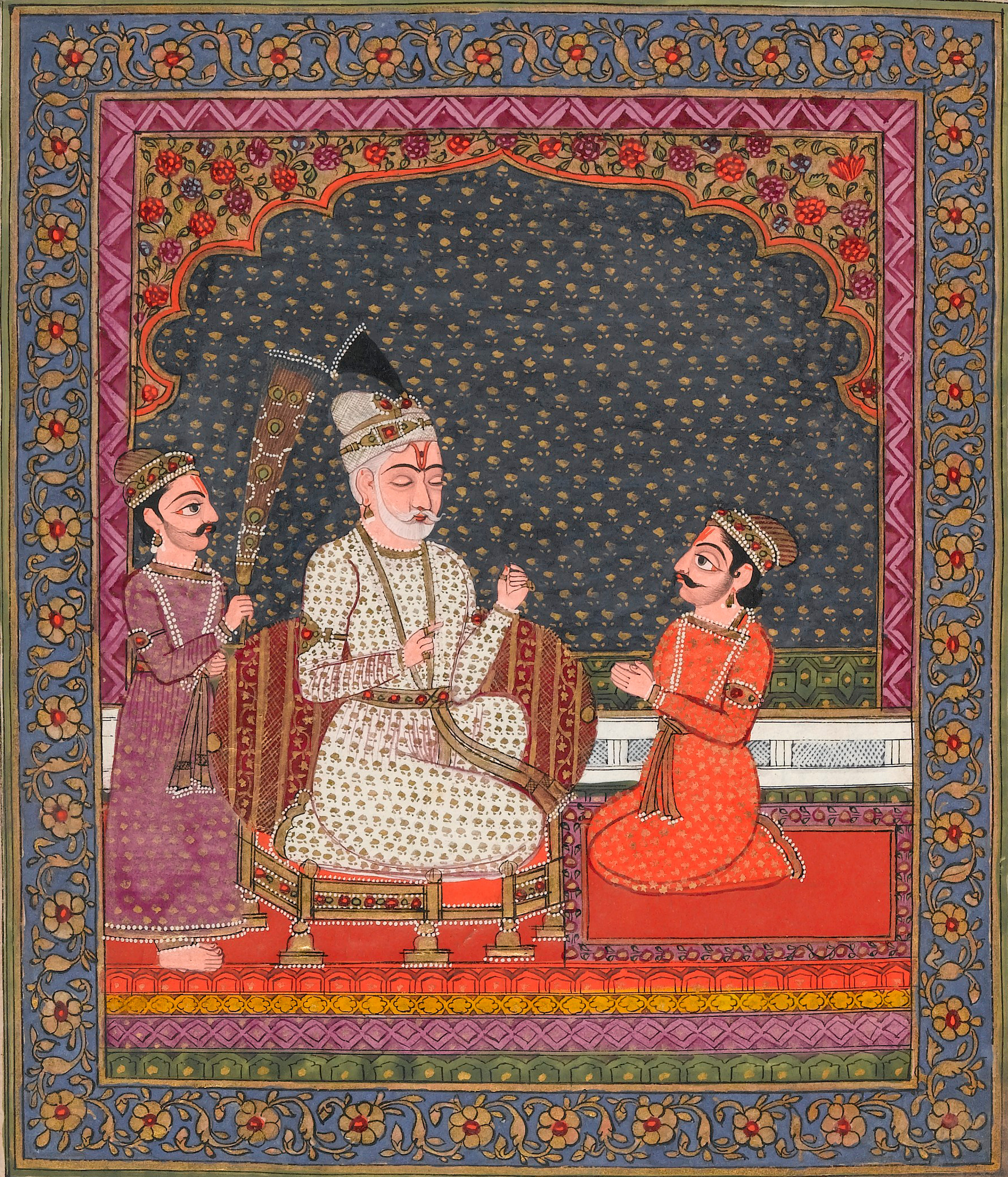
Painting of Sanjaya narrating the events of the war to Dhritarashtra

The blind king Dhritarashtra requests his charioteer Sanjaya to offer him an eyewitness account of the events of the Kurukshetra War from the battlefield. Sanjaya begins his narration. Duryodhana, the eldest Kaurava prince, goes to Drona and describes the combatants and the commanders of the Pandava and the Kaurava armies. On the battlefield, Bhishma blows his conch to raise the morale of the warriors. He is joined by Krishna, who blows his conch, called the Panchajanya, and Arjuna, who blows his conch, called the Devadatta. A number of warriors of both sides follow suit. Arjuna asks Krishna, his charioteer, to drive the chariot to the centre of battlefield to survey both the armies. After surveying them, Arjuna expresses his despair to Krishna, wondering how he is to participate in a war that would require him to fight his own kinsmen. He expresses the futility of fighting for victory and pleasure when the people he wishes to fight for bore arms against him. He muses the unrighteousness and the sinful nature of fighting against his teachers and family members. He concludes that such an internecine conflict would only lead to destruction of his family and result in adharma, all for the greed of gaining a kingdom. He reflects that the end of his family would result in the abandonment of traditional rites, impiety, the suffering of women, intermarriage, and the deprivation of his departed forefathers. He exclaims that he would rather be slain by the Kauravas unopposed and unarmed. Arjuna sits within his chariot and sets aside his bow and arrows, overcome with despair.

== Significance ==
The significance of this chapter lies in its profound philosophical teachings and its role in setting the stage for the rest of the Bhagavad Gita. This chapter addresses universal themes such as duty, morality, self-doubt, and the nature of life. It serves as a foundation for the entire dialogue between Arjuna and Krishna, laying the groundwork for the subsequent teachings on dharma (righteous duty), karma (action), and spiritual liberation. Arjuna's internal struggle reflects the human experience of grappling with ethical dilemmas and existential questions, making this chapter relatable and relevant to people across cultures and time periods.

== See also ==
- Bhagavad Gita
- Samkhya Yoga (Bhagavad Gita)
- Karma Yoga (Bhagavad Gita)
- Arjuna's Dilemma
