= Tamas (philosophy) =

Hindu philosophical concept

Tamas (Sanskrit: तमस् tamas, lit. 'darkness') is one of the three guṇas (tendencies, qualities, attributes), a philosophical and psychological concept developed by the Samkhya school of Hindu philosophy. Tamas is the quality of inertia, inactivity, dullness, or lethargy. The other two qualities are rajas (passion and activity) and sattva (purity, goodness). Generally it is referred to as the lowest guṇa of the three.

== Etymology ==
The Vedic word támas refers to "darkness", and stems from the Indo-European word *temH-es, meaning "dark". Cognates with the Vedic include the Lithuanian word tamsà meaning "darkness", the Serbian word tama meaning "darkness", as well as the Latin word tenebrae meaning "darkness", the latter whence English tenebrous.

== Hinduism ==
In Samkhya philosophy, a guṇa is one of three "tendencies, qualities": sattva, rajas and tamas. This category of qualities have been widely adopted by various schools of Hinduism for categorizing behavior and natural phenomena. The three qualities are:

- Sattva is the quality of balance, harmony, goodness, purity, universalizing, holistic, positive, peaceful, virtuous.
- Rajas is the quality of passion, activity, being driven, moving, dynamic.
- Tamas is the quality of dullness or inactivity, apathy, inertia or lethargy.

Action that is virtuous, thought through, free from attachment, and without craving for results is considered Sattvic. Action that is driven purely by craving for pleasure, selfishness and much effort is Rajasic. Action that is undertaken because of delusion, disregarding consequences, without considering loss or injury to others or self, is called Tamasic.

In Indian philosophy, these qualities are not considered as present in either-or fashion. Rather, everyone and everything has all three, only in different proportions and in different contexts. The living being or substance is viewed as the net result of the joint effect of these three qualities.

According to the Samkya school, no one and nothing is either purely Sattvic, Rajasic or Tamasic. One's nature and behavior is a complex interplay of all guṇas in varying degrees. In some, the conduct is Rajasic with significant influence of Sattvic guṇa; in some it is Rajasic with significant influence of Tamasic guṇa, and so on.

In Bhagavad Gita verse 18.32, the influence of tamas on buddhi is described as where a person "regards wickedness as virtue and virtue as wickedness".

== Sikhism ==
The Sikh scripture refers to tamas in its verses:

- "The Fourteenth Day: one who enters into the fourth state, overcomes time, and the three qualities of rajas, tamas, and sattva." (SGGS )
- "Those who embody the energies of sattva-white light, rajas-red passion, and tamas-black darkness, abide in the Fear of God, along with the many created forms." (SGGS )
- "Your Power is diffused through the three gunas: rajas, tamas and sattva." (SGGS )
- "Rajas, the quality of energy and activity; tamas, the quality of darkness and inertia; and sattva, the quality of purity and light, are all called the creations of Maya, Your illusion. That man who realizes the fourth state – he alone obtains the supreme state." (SGGS )

== See also ==
- Tamasic foods
