= Rajas =

Hindu philosophical concept

Rajas (Sanskrit: रजस्) is one of the three guṇas (tendencies, qualities, attributes), a philosophical and psychological concept developed by the Samkhya school of Hindu philosophy. The other two qualities are sattva (goodness, balance), and tamas (lethargy, violence, disorder). Rajas is innate tendency or quality that drives motion, energy, and activity.

Rajas is sometimes translated as passion, where it is used in the sense of activity, which according to the context can be either good or bad. Rajas helps actualize the other two guṇa.

== Description ==
In Samkhya philosophy, a guṇa is one of three "tendencies, qualities": sattva, rajas and tamas. This category of qualities have been widely adopted by various schools of Hinduism for categorizing behavior and natural phenomena. The three qualities are:

- Sattva is the quality of balance, harmony, goodness, purity, universalizing, holistic, constructive, creative, building, positive attitude, luminous, serenity, being-ness, peaceful, virtuous.
- Rajas is the quality of passion, activity, neither good nor bad and sometimes either, self-centeredness, egoistic, individualizing, driven, moving, dynamic.
- Tamas is the quality of imbalance, disorder, chaos, anxiety, impure, destructive, delusion, negative, dull or inactive, apathy, inertia or lethargy, violent, vicious, ignorant.

In Indian philosophy, these qualities are not considered as present in either-or fashion. Rather, everyone and everything has all three, only in different proportions and in different contexts. The living being or substance is viewed as the net result of the joint effect of these three qualities.

According to Samkhya school, no one and nothing is either purely sattvic or purely rajasic or purely tamasic. One's nature and behavior is a complex interplay of all of these, with each guna in varying degrees. In some, the conduct is rajasic with significant influence of sattvic guṇa, in some it is rajasic with significant influence of tamasic guna, and so on.

In the fourteenth chapter of the Bhagavad Gita, rajas is described as being of a passionate nature, driving desire, attachment, and action. When rajas is dominant, it manifests as greed, restlessness, agitation, and constant engagement in actions, which obscure wisdom and keep one bound to the cycle of worldly pursuits.

== Discussion ==
Rajas is that quality or attribute in a substance (prakriti) or individual which promotes or upholds the activity of the other aspects of nature (prakriti) such as one or more of the following:

1. action;famous
2. change, mutation;
3. passion, excitement;
4. birth, creation, generation.

If a person or thing tends to be extremely active, excitable, or passionate, that person or thing could be said to have a preponderance of rajas. It is contrasted with the quality of tamas, which is the quality of inactivity, darkness, and laziness, and with sattva, which is the quality of purity, clarity, calmness and creativity. Rajas is viewed as being more positive than tamas, and less positive than sattva, except, perhaps, for one who has "transcended the gunas" and achieved equanimity in all fields of relative life.

== See also ==
- Samkhyakarika (verses 12 to 14 discuss Sattva, Rajas and Tamas)
