= Sattva =

Hindu philosophical concept

Sattva (Sanskrit: सत्त्व, meaning 'goodness, harmony') is one of the three guṇas or "modes of existence" (tendencies, qualities, attributes), a philosophical and psychological concept understood by the Samkhya school of Hindu philosophy. The other two qualities are rajas (passion and activity) and tamas (destruction, chaos, inertia). Sattva is the quality of goodness, purity, positivity, truth, serenity, balance, peacefulness, and virtuousness that is drawn towards Dharma and jñāna (knowledge). The act or a person who bears this is called Sattvik.

== Hinduism ==
=== Samkhya Philosophy ===
In Samkhya philosophy, a guṇa is one of three "tendencies, qualities": sattva, rajas and tamas. This category of qualities has been widely adopted by various schools of Hinduism for categorizing behavior and natural phenomena. The three qualities are:

- Sattva is the quality of balance, harmony, goodness, purity, universalizing, holistic, constructive, creative, building, positive attitude, luminous, serenity, being-ness, peaceful, virtuous.
- Rajas is the quality of passion, activity, neither good nor bad and sometimes either, self-centeredness, egoistic, individualizing, driven, moving, dynamic.
- Tamas is the quality of imbalance, disorder, chaos, anxiety, impure, destructive, delusion, negative, dull or inactive, apathy, inertia or lethargy, violent, vicious, ignorant.

In Indian philosophy, these qualities are not considered as being present in either-or manner - instead everyone and everything has all three but differing in proportions and in different contexts. The living being or any substance is viewed as being a net result of the joint effect of all these three qualities within them. The combination of gunas is not considered static and set. Hindu literature, such as the Bhagavad Gita, state this balance of gunas to be dynamic and changeable.

According to the Samkhya school, no one and nothing is either purely sattvik or purely rajasik or purely tamasik. One's nature and behavior is a complex interplay of all of these, with each guna in varying degrees. In some, the conduct is rajasik with significant influence of sattvik guna, in some it is rajasik with significant influence of tamasik guna, and so on.

=== Bhagavad Gita ===
The Bhagavad Gita describes sattva as a path to liberation. It describes sattva as superior to the other two gunas because it brings clarity, leads to higher realms, and is without impurities, but it is also described as a cause of bondage. Verse 14.6 describes sattva as:

because sattva is flawless it is luminous and has no contamination. It is through attachment to happiness and attachment to knowledge (jñana) that it causes bondage, O sinless one.

— The Bhagavad Gita, Chapter 14, verse 6

It causes bondage, as explained in verse 14.9, by attachment to happiness.

=== Vishishtadvaita ===
According to Ramanuja, the divine realm (Vaikuntha) is composed of pure, immutable sattva, or shuddha sattva. In liberation, the individual self transcends its material body and attains a pure form composed of shuddha sattva.

== Buddhism ==
Sattva, or satta in Pali language, is found in Buddhist texts, such as in Bodhi-sattva. The sattva in Buddhism means "a living being, creature, person or sentient being".

== See also ==
- Sat (Sanskrit)
- Sattvik diet
- Satya
- Tattva
- Sentient beings (Buddhism)
- Vidya (Knowledge)
