= 2020 in Asian music =

== Events ==
- 11 March – Ibrahim Gökçek and Helin Bölek, members of the Turkish band Grup Yorum, are taken to hospital for treatment in the course of their long-running hunger strike, but they are discharged a week later after refusing treatment.
- Music album on ancient Tamil poetry, Sandham: Symphony Meets Classical Tamil by Composer Raleigh Rajan featured in Amazon's Top#10 International Music albums in July 2020 -
- 25 May – Kim Woo-seok releases his first solo single and mini-album.
- 27 July – Mongolian band The Hu go to the top of the UK Rock & Metal Albums Chart with their debut album The Gereg.

== Albums ==
- AGA – So Called Love Songs (September 28)
- Sandham: Symphony Meets Classical Tamil by Composer Rajan Somasundaram and sung by Bombay Jayashri, Saindhavi, Karthik, Pragathi Guruprasad, Priyanka, William Henry Curry and others -
- BTS – Map of the Soul: 7 (February 21)
- Hiroko Moriguchi – Gundam Song Covers 2 (June 10)
- Joji – Nectar (July 10)
- Sugam Pokharel – Swyet Hanshini
- Unique Salonga – PANGALAN: (March 27)
- Hemant Sharma – Indra Daliye (May 21)
- Winner – Remember (April 9)
- SB19 – Get in the Zone (Album) (July 31)

== Classical ==
- Bechara El Khoury – Unfinished Journey
- Jasdeep Singh Degun – Arya
- Karen Tanaka – Techno Etudes II

== Opera ==
- Huang Ruo and David Henry Hwang – M. Butterfly

== Film and TV scores ==
- Eishi Segawa – The Untold Tale of the Three Kingdoms
- Gopi Sundar – Entha Manchivaadavuraa

== Musical films ==
- Chal Mera Putt 2 (India - Punjabi)
- Kilometers and Kilometers (India - Malayalam), with score by Sushin Shyam and songs by Sooraj S. Kurup
- King of Prism All Stars: Prism Show Best 10 (Japan)
- Love Aaj Kal (India - Hindi)
- Naan Sirithal (India - Tamil)
- Sarileru Neekevvaru (India - Telugu)
- Shahenshah (Bangladesh)
- Street Dancer 3D (India - Hindi)

== Deaths ==
- January 1 – Katsura Shinnosuke, 67, Japanese rakugoka and musician (leukaemia)
- January 4 – Junko Hirotani, 63, Japanese singer (breast cancer)
- January 19 – Sunanda Patnaik, 85, Indian classical singer
- February 14 – Sonam Sherpa, 48, Indian guitarist (cardiac arrest)
- February 27 – Suthep Wongkamhaeng, 85, Thai luk krung singer
- March 17
  - Hsiao Feng Hsien, 79, Taiwanese operatic singer and actress.
  - Thái Thanh, 85, Vietnamese-American singer.
- March 29 – Paravai Muniyamma, 82, Indian folk singer and actress
- April 2 – Nirmal Singh Khalsa, 67, Indian singer and priest (COVID-19)
- April 3 – Helin Bölek, 28, Armenian/Turkish singer (hunger strike)
- April 6 – M. K. Arjunan, 84, Indian composer.
- April 8 – Glenn Fredly, 44, Indonesian R&B singer-songwriter (meningitis)
- April 10 – Shanti Hiranand, 87, Indian classical singer
- May 5 – Didi Kempot, 53, Indonesian campursari singer
- May 7 – Ibrahim Gökçek, 39/40, Turkish folk musician (hunger strike)
- May 16 – Azad Rahman, 76, Bangladeshi composer
- May 29 – Yogesh, 77, Indian lyricist
- June 1 – Wajid Khan (Sajid–Wajid), 43, Indian composer (complications from kidney infection and COVID-19)
- July 30 – Sonam Tshering Lepcha, 92, Indian folk musician and composer
- August 9 – Alauddin Ali, 67, Bangladeshi composer (lung complications)
- August 17 – Pandit Jasraj, 90, Indian classical vocalist
- September 9 – Yopie Latul, 65, Indonesian singer
- September 16 – Alien Huang, 36, Taiwanese singer, actor and television presenter (aortic dissection)
- September 25 – S. P. Balasubrahmanyam, 74, Indian playback singer (COVID-19)
- October 8 – Mohammad-Reza Shajarian, 80, Iranian traditional vocalist master
- October 9 – David Refael ben Ami, 70, Israeli singer
- November 10 – Rahayu Supanggah, 71, Indonesian composer

== By country ==
- 2020 in Chinese music
- 2020 in Japanese music
- 2020 in Philippine music
- 2020 in South Korean music

== See also ==
- 2020 in music
