= Ashtavakra Gita =

Advaita Vedanta scripture

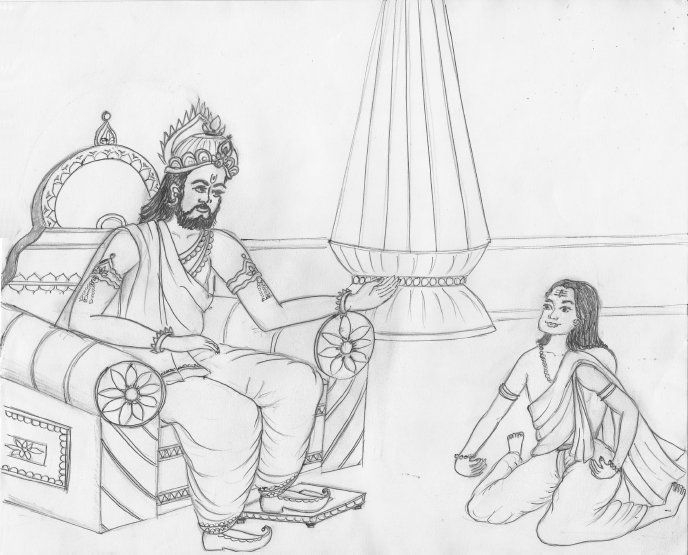
Janaka and Ashtavakra

The Ashtavakra Gita (IAST: aṣṭāvakragītā) or Song of Ashtavakra is a classical Vedanta text in the form of a dialogue between the sage Ashtavakra and Janaka, king of Mithila.

== Dating ==
Radhakamal Mukerjee, an Indian social scientist, dated the book to the period immediately after the Hindu scripture Bhagavad Gita (600 BCE according to Mukerjee; commonly dated to ca. 2nd century BCE), at c. 500–400 BCE. J. L. Brockington, emeritus professor of Sanskrit at the University of Edinburgh, places the Ashtavakra Gita much later, supposing it to have been written either in the eighth century CE by a follower of Adi Shankara, or in the fourteenth century during a resurgence of Shankara's teaching. Sri Swami Shantananda Puri suggests that since the book contains the seed of the theory of non-creation Ajata Vada developed later by Gaudapada in Mandookya Karika, this book comes from a period prior to that of Gaudapada (6th century CE) and hence prior to Shankara.

== Identification of Ashtavakra ==
Ashtavakra is probably identical to the holy sage with the same name who appears in Mahabharata, though the connection is not clearly stated in any of the texts. Mukherjee identifies Janaka as the father of Sita and disciple of the sage Yajnavalkya in the Brihadaranyaka Upanishad. (Note: Janaka receives the teaching of the supreme Self from Yajnavalkya in the Brihadaranyaka Upanishad.) Janaka is also depicted as a king who has attained perfection in vedas. The king during the period of Ashtavakra was Ugrasena Janaka in the Mithila Kingdom.

== Contents ==
=== Overview ===
Ashtavakra Gita is a dialogue between Ashtavakra and Janaka on the nature of Self/Atman, reality and bondage. It offers a radical version of non-dualist philosophy. The Gita insists on the complete unreality of the external world and absolute oneness of existence. It does not mention any morality or duties, and therefore is seen by commentators as 'godless'. It also dismisses names and forms as unreal and a sign of ignorance.

In a conversation between Janaka and Ashtavakra, pertaining to the deformity of his crooked body, Ashtavakra explains that the size of a temple is not affected by how it is shaped, and the shape of his own body does not affect himself (or Atman). The ignorant man's vision is shrouded by names and forms, but a wise man sees only the Self:

You are really unbound and action-less, self-illuminating and spotless already. The cause of your bondage is that you are still resorting to stilling the mind. (I.15)

You are unconditioned and changeless, formless and immovable, unfathomable awareness, imperturbable- such consciousness is un-clinging. (I.17)

You are not bound by anything. What does a pure person like you need to renounce? Putting the complex organism to rest, you can go to your rest. (V.1)

=== Structure ===
The book comprises 20 chapters:

- I Saksi - Vision of the Self as the All-pervading Witness;
- II Ascaryam - Marvel of the Infinite Self Beyond Nature;
- III Atmadvaita - Self in All and All in the Self;
- IV Sarvamatma - Knower and the Non-knower of the Self;
- V Laya - Stages of Dissolution of Consciousness;
- VI Prakrteh Parah - Irrelevance of Dissolution of Consciousness;
- VII Santa - Tranquil and Boundless Ocean of the Self;
- VIII Moksa - Absolute and Eternal Freedom from all kinds of self assumed Bondages;
- IX Nirveda - Indifference;
- X Vairagya - Dispassion;
- XI Cittrupa - Self as Pure and Radiant Intelligence;
- XII Svabhava - Ascent of Contemplation;
- XIII Yathasukham - Transcendent Bliss;
- XIV Isvara - Natural Dissolution of the Mind;
- XV Tattvam - Unborn Self or Brahman;
- XVI Svasthya - Self-Abidance through Obliteration of the World;
- XVII Kaivalya - Absolute Aloneness of the Self;
- XVIII Jivanmukti - State of the being where the individual has attained salvation while being alive;
- XIX Svamahima - Majesty of the Self;
- XX Akincanabhava - Transcendence of the Self.

== Legacy ==
The work was known, appreciated and quoted by Ramakrishna and his disciple Vivekananda, as well as Ramana Maharshi. Sarvepalli Radhakrishnan refers to it with great respect. Osho called Ashtavakra Gita as Mahageeta.

Ashtavakra Gita continues to inspire people. The first musical form of Ashtavakra Gita Saksi I (Chapter 1) was set in the raga Svadhya by Composer Raleigh Rajan.

== Translations and commentaries ==
- Lala Baij Nath was the first to translate this text into English in 1907.
- Swami Nityaswarupananda has written a word by word translation from 1929 to 1931.
- Radhakamal Mukerjee (1889–1968) continued the discourse into English with his work posthumously published in 1971.
- Scott R. Stroud (2004), wrote on the Astavakra Gita as a work of multivalent narrative.
- The Heart of Awareness: A Translation of the Ashtavakra Gita (Shambhala Dragon Editions) translated by Thomas Byrom, 1990.
- Swami Chinmayananda wrote a commentary on the Ashtavakra Gita, which has references to the Upanishads to help convey the meaning of the text.
- John Richards published an English translation of the Ashtavakra Gita in 1997.
- Osho has given commentary on Ashtavakra Gita in a long series of 91 discourses named as Ashtavakra Mahageeta, given in his Pune Ashram.
- Sri Sri Ravi Shankar has given commentary on Ashtavakra Gita in Hindi and English.
- Pujya Gurudevshri Rakeshbhai has given commentary on Ashtavakra Gita through 60 discourses totalling more than 116 hours.
- The Book has also been translated into Urdu language with the title of Mehak-e-Agahi, 2021.
- Alexandra David-Néel, translated the text from Sanskrit into French, title Astavakra Gîtâ, 1951.

== See also ==
- Avadhuta Gita
- Ribhu Gita
- Bhagavad Gita
- The Ganesha Gita
- Self-consciousness (Vedanta)
- Uddhava Gita
- Vedas
- Prasthanatrayi
- Vyadha Gita

== Sources ==
- Mukerjee, Radhakaml (1971), Aṣṭāvakragītā (the Song of the Self Supreme): The Classical Text of Ātmādvaita by Aṣṭāvakra, Motilal Banarsidass, ISBN 978-81-208-1367-0
