= Mahibalanpatti =

Village in Tamil Nadu, India

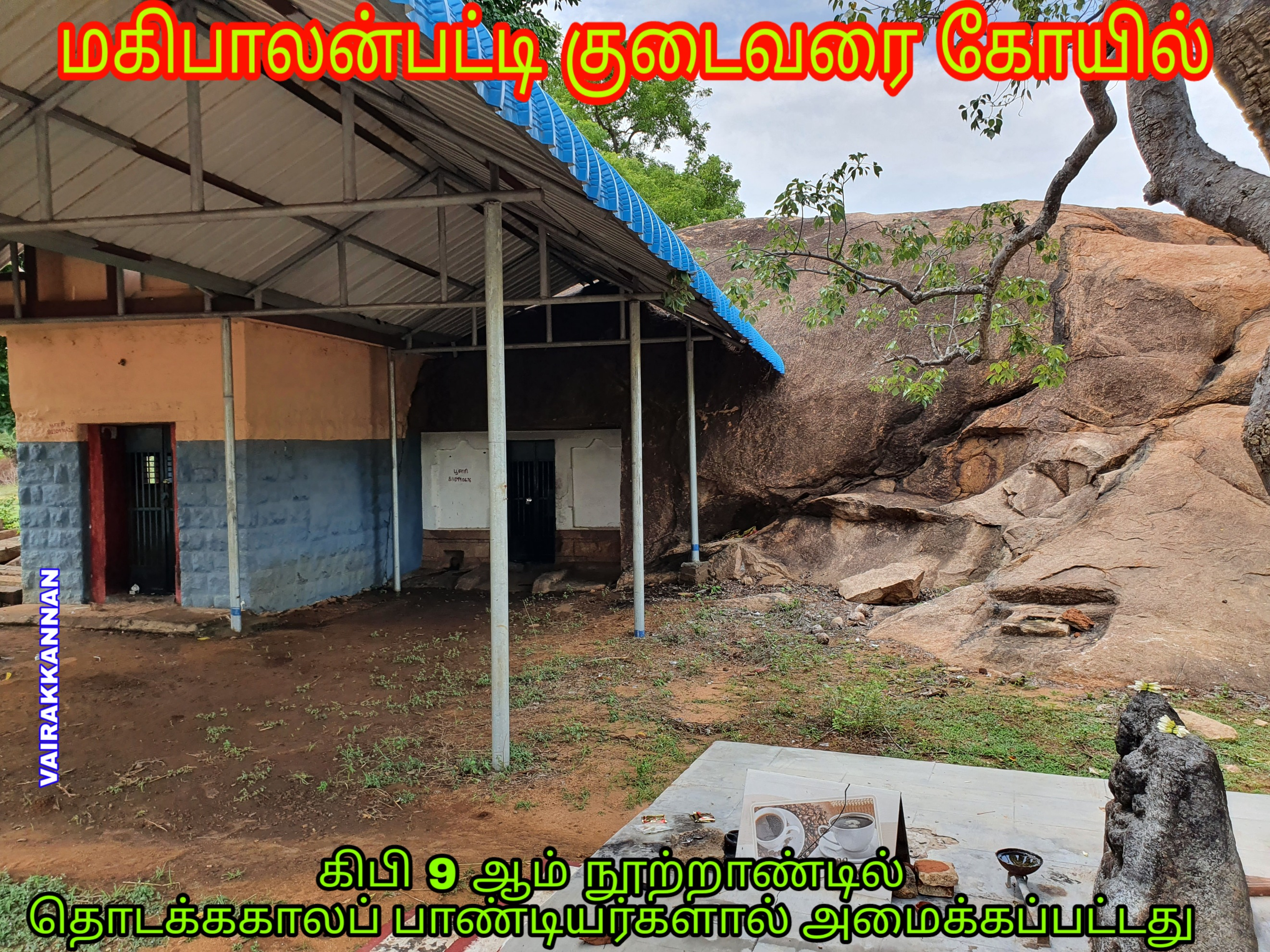
Mahibalanpatti Rock Cut Cave Temple

Mahibalanpatti is a village panchayat in the Thiruppatur taluk of Sivaganga district in the Tamil Nadu state of India. It covers 24 1/2 villages. The ancient poet Kaniyan Pungundranar was born in this village. It is one of the Chettinadu Villages.

Kaniyan Poongunranar, also Poongundranar or Pungundranar (Kaṉiyan Pūngunṟanār), was a Tamil philosopher from the Sangam age between 6th century BCE and 1st century CE. His name Kaniyan implies that he was an Kaala Kanithar astrologer as it is a Tamil word referring Kaala Kanitham, Mathematics of date, time and the place. Kaniyan was born and brought up in Mahibalanpatti, a village panchayat in Tamil Nadu's Sivaganga district. He composed two poems in Puṟanāṉūṟu and Natrinai. His Tamil quote "Yaadhum Oore Yaavarum Kelir" is at present depicted in the United Nations Organisation. A. P. J. Abdul Kalam was the first one to quote this in a European Union Historical Speech by Abdul Kalam in European Union and the other one is Narendra Modi who quoted it in 74th session of the UN General Assembly. The first musical form of Yaadhum Oore poem by composer Rajan was chosen as the theme song of 10th World Tamil Conference.

Historically, this area was managed by a small king called Mahibalan, hence the name Mahibalanpatti. Here the temple of Sri Poongundra Nayaki Amman Temple (Durga) (Sanskrit: दुर्गा, IAST: 'Durgā'), identified a principal and popular form of the Hindu Goddess Parvati. She is a goddess of war, the warrior form of Parvati, whose mythology centres around combating evils and demonic forces that threaten peace, prosperity, and Dharma the power of good over evil. Durga is also a fierce form of the protective mother goddess, who unleashes her divine wrath against the wicked for the liberation of the oppressed, and entails destruction to empower creation.
