= Sempulapeyaneerar =

Sempulapeyaneerar (Tamil: செம்புலப் பெயனீரார், literally "he of water that has rained on red fields") was a poet of the Sangam period, to whom a sole verse of the Sangam literature has been attributed.

== Biography ==
Sempulapeyaneerar is said to have hailed from a geographic region with an abundance of red clay. With the Tamil literary tradition's practice of identifying a poet by a phrase or word from his or her poem, Sempulapeyaneerar came to be known so owing to his usage of the imagery "red earth and pouring rain" to denote the union of loving couples in his Sangam verse.

== Contribution to the Sangam literature ==
Sempulapeyaneerar wrote a sole Sangam verse, verse 40 of the Kurunthogai, and also compiled the Kurunthogai anthology. It is arguably one of the most renowned and oft-quoted of the Sangam anthology. It speaks about two lovers uniting, with the man reassuring his ladylove of his love.

யாயும் ஞாயும் யாரா கியரோ, எந்தையும் நுந்தையும் எம்முறைக் கேளிர், யானும் நீயும் எவ்வழி யறிதும், செம்புலப் பெயனீர் போல, அன்புடை நெஞ்சம் தாங்கலந் தனவே. (Original verse by Sempulapeyaneerar)	What could be my mother be to yours? What kin is my father to yours anyway? And how did you and I meet ever? But in love our hearts are as red earth and pouring rain: mingled beyond parting. (A. K. Ramanujan translation)	My mother and yours, what were they to each other? My father and yours, how were they kin? I and you, how do we know each other? and yet like water that has rained on red fields, our hearts in their love have mixed together. (George L. Hart translation)

== Legacy ==
Verse 40 of the Kurunthogai inspired many down the centuries, chiefly by its powerful imagery in the words "red earth and pouring rain" which is considered very evocative. It is the inspiration behind the title of Vikram Chandra's award-winning English novel, Red Earth and Pouring Rain. The poem was exhibited in the London metro train service in 2001.

The original lyrics of the Yayum poem was part of the album Sandham: Symphony Meets Classical Tamil by American composer Raleigh Rajan and was featured in Amazon's Top#10 International Music albums in July 2020.

The poetry has also inspired several Tamil film songs, including 'Oru Thanga rathathil' from Dharma Yuddham, 'Narumugaye' from movie Iruvar, 'Solai poovil malai thenral' from movie Vellai Roja, 'Pattam poochi' from movie Chithiram Pesuthadi, 'Munbe Vaa' from movie Sillunu Oru Kaadhal, 'Yaayum' from Movie Sagaa.

== See also ==
- Kurunthogai
- Sangam literature
- List of Sangam poets
