= Pragathi Guruprasad =

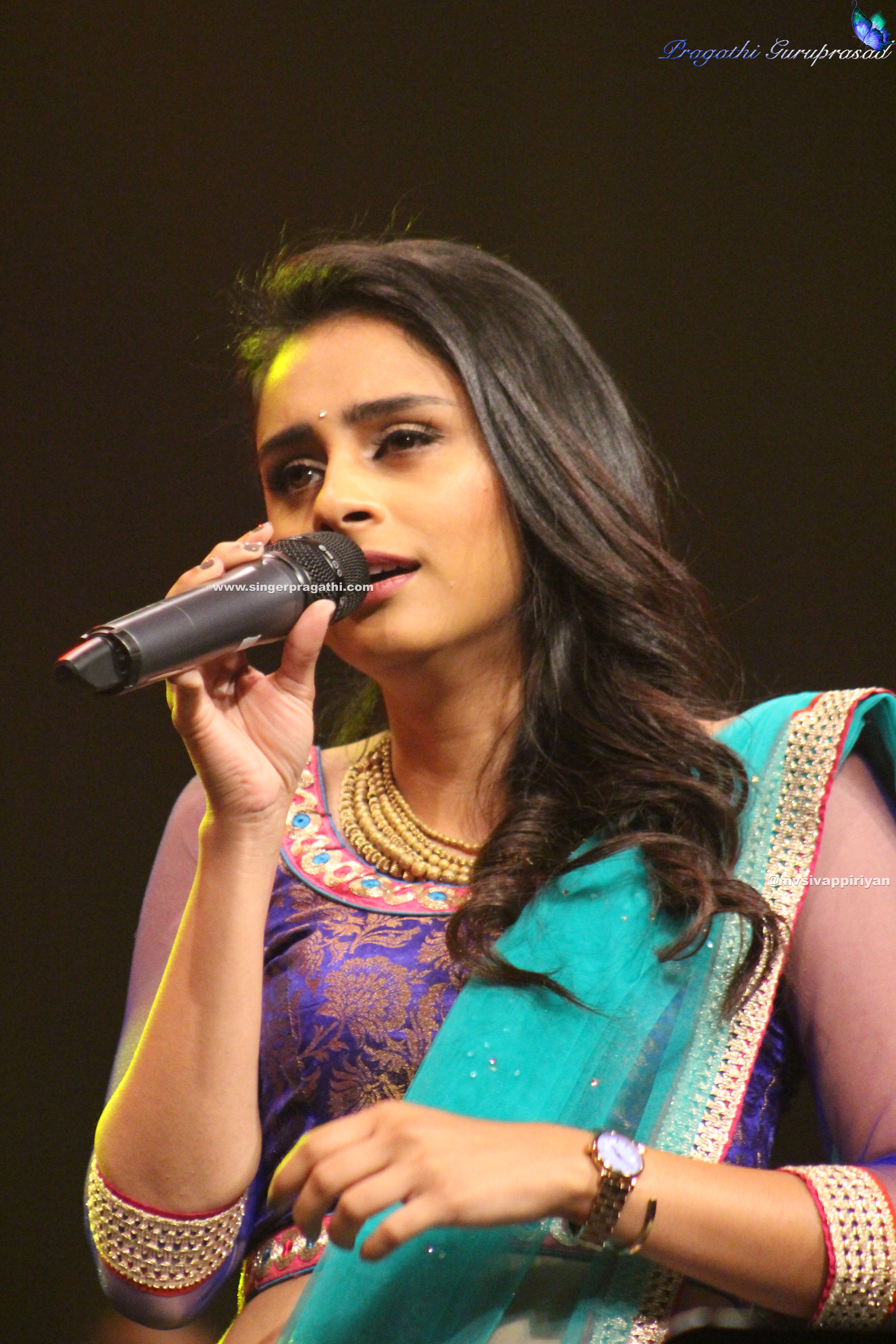

Background information
- Also known as: Pragathi
- Born: Pragathi Guruprasath; 14 September 1997 (age 29); Queenstown, Singapore
- Origin: Fremont, California, US
- Genres: Carnatic and Western music
- Occupation: Playback singer
- Instrument: Vocalist
- Years active: 2012–present
- Website: singerpragathi.com

Pragathy Guruprasad is a Singaporean-American playback singer who has worked in Indian Tamil-language films. Brought up in Fremont, California, she finished as a runner-up in the Airtel Super Singer Junior 3 show, which aired from October 17, 2011, to October 26, 2012.

== Personal life ==
Pragathi Guruprasad was born to Guruprasad and Kanaka on 14 September 1997 in an Indian Singaporean family, and she has an elder sister, Saiprithvi. In Singapore, her father taught Carnatic lessons, and since at the age of five, Pragathi had also begun training in carnatic music. Her family subsequently relocated to Fremont, California where she continued learning Carnatic and Hindustani music from both her father at first and then from a teacher, Sangeetha Swaminathan, a disciple of Sudha Raghunathan.

== Career ==
In July 2014, she signed on to make her acting debut by portraying a supporting role in Bala's Tharai Thappattai (2016), but later opted out owing to her college commitments. In September 2016, Bala later announced that she would portray the lead role in his next project starring actor Yuvan. However the film was eventually shelved before production began.

In 2020, she made an appearance in a small role in the American comedy drama Never Have I Ever. Pragathi sang the popular Tamil Sangam poetry 'Yayum Ngayum' for the album Sandham: Symphony Meets Classical Tamil by Composer Raleigh Rajan, which in July 2020, was featured in Amazon's Top#10 International Music albums.

== Discography ==
Year	Song	Film/Album	Music Director	Language	Ref
2012	Kalakku	Panithuli	Agnel Roman, Faizan Hussain	Tamil	
2012	Sengaade	Paradesi	G. V. Prakash Kumar	Tamil	
2012	Or Mirugam	Paradesi	G. V. Prakash Kumar	Tamil	
2012	Naan Naana	Life	Sri Vijay	Tamil	
2013	Tamarai Kanna	Jaya Jagannath	Jayakumar	Tamil	
2013	Hari Hareye Namah	Jaya Jagannath	Jayakumar	Tamil	
2013	Pada Pada Pattampoochi	Pattampoochi Single	Kowtham Mohanarajan	Tamil	
2013	Osaka Osaka	Vanakkam Chennai	Anirudh Ravichander	Tamil	
2013	Aasai	Vaanavil- The Quest	Vernon G Segaram	Tamil	
2013	Yaedho	Yeadho - Single	Swamy Kitcha	Tamil	
2015	Thean Kudika	Maze In Idhayam	Steve Cliff	Tamil	
2016	Paravai Parandhuchu	Kadhalum Kadandhu Pogum	Santhosh Narayanan	Tamil	
2016	Kadavulae Vidai	Rum	Anirudh Ravichander	Tamil	
2017	Uyire Oru Kadhal	Uyire Oru Kadhal	Chris G	Tamil	
2017	Usuraiya Tholaichaen	Usuraiya Tholaichaen - Single	Stephen Zechariah	Tamil	
2017	Laali Laali	Theeran Adhigaram Ondru	Ghibran	Tamil	
2018	Bittersweet	Cherie	Kevin Anthony	English	
2018	Piriyame Piriyame	Ratsasan	Ghibran	Tamil	
2019	Gokka Makka	Titanic Kadhalum Kavundhu Pogum	Nivas K. Prasanna	Tamil	
2019	Sevvandhi Poove	Kanne Kalaimaane	Yuvan Shankar Raja	Tamil	
2019	Yayum Nyayum	Sandham- Symphony Meets Classical Tamil	Raleigh Rajan	Tamil	
2019	Poraali Penne	Madras Gig	Keba Jeremiah	Tamil	
2025	Adada	Adada - Single	Pragathi Guruprasad	Tamil	
2025	Kathiri Veliyil	Sumo	Nivas K. Prasanna	Tamil	
2026	Un Paarvai	Kadhal Reset Repeat	Harris Jayaraj	Tamil	

== Television ==
Year	Name	Role	Network	Notes
2023	Hunters	Priya	Amazon Prime Video	Season 2 episode "Buenos Aires"
2024	Super Singer Season 10	Guest	Star Vijay	
