= Xavier Thaninayagam =

Sri Lankan Tamil scholar

Rev. Xavier S. Thani Nayagam தனிநாயகம் அடிகளார்
- Born: August 2, 1913; Kayts, Jaffna District, Sri Lanka
- Died: September 1, 1980 (aged 67); Jaffna, Sri Lanka
- Known for: Founder of the International Association for Tamil Research (IATR)
- Website: https://web.archive.org/web/20130707111944/ http://thaninayagamadigalar.com/

Reverend Xavier S. Thani Nayagam (Tamil: சேவியர் தனிநாயகம், 2 August 1913 - 1 September 1980) was a Tamil scholar known for setting up the International Association for Tamil Research (IATR) and organising the first World Tamil Conference. He is praised as the "Roving Ambassador for Tamil".

== Biography ==
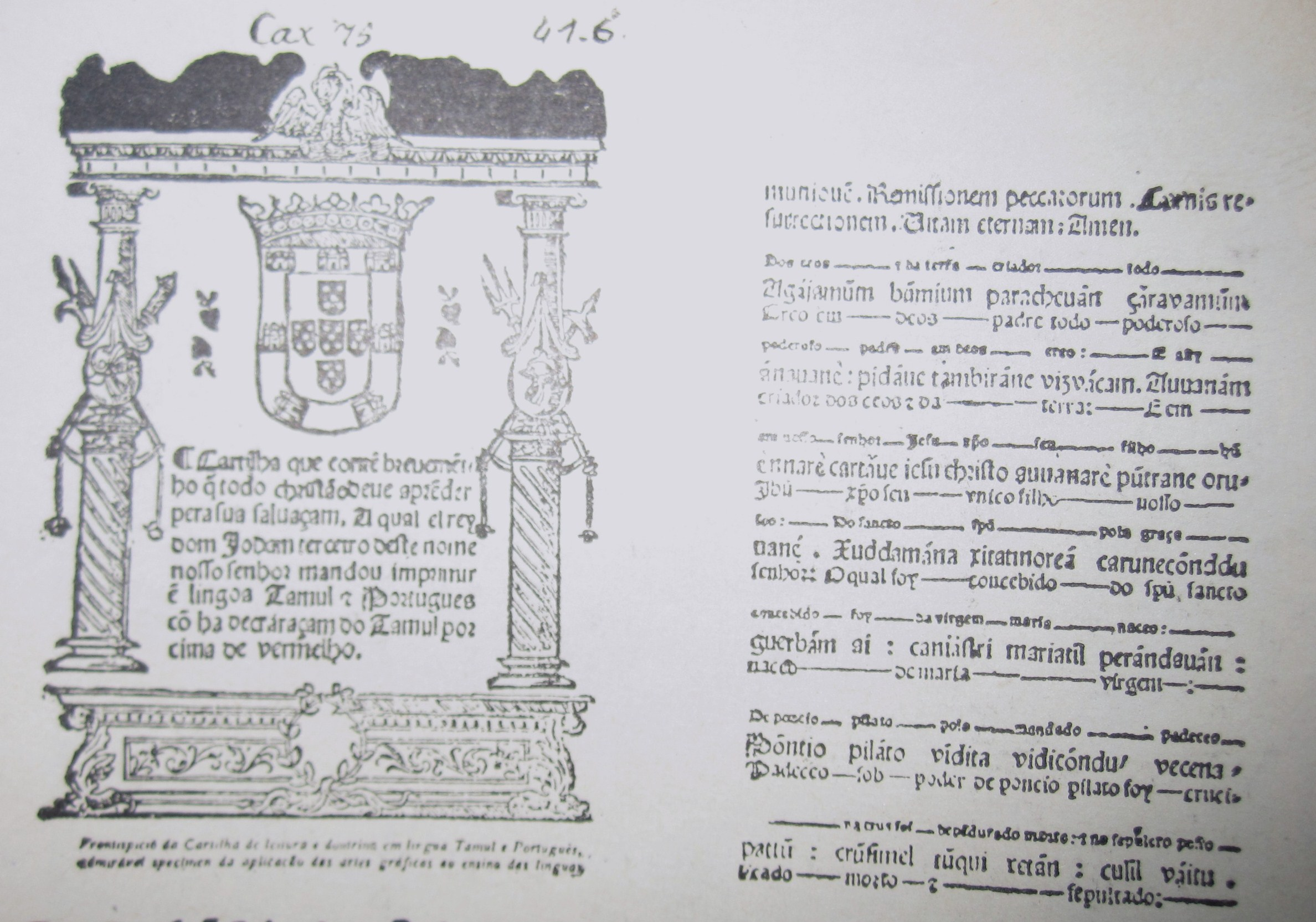
A page from the first printed Tamil book - Luso-Tamil Catechism (Cartilha) printed in Lisbon in 1554 CE. It was rediscovered by Thaninayagam in the 1950s.

Born as Xavier Nicholas Stanislaus, he later came to be called as Xavier Stanislaus Thaninayagam (his last name is often written as two words - Thani Nayagam) and also respectfully as "Thaninayagam Adigal". Thaninayagam was born in Kayts, Jaffna Peninsula in British Ceylon. His parents were Naganathan Stanislaus and Cecilia Bastiampillai. He chose the surname Thaninayagam (literally "lone hero") after becoming a Roman Catholic priest. During 1920–22, he studied at St.Patrick's College, Jaffna. In 1934 he obtained his BA in Philosophy from St. Bernard's seminary, Colombo. Though he was a Tamil by birth, he did not learn the language until he was much older. During his younger days, he learnt and became fluent in many European languages such as English, Latin, Italian, French, German, Spanish and Portuguese.

He first learnt Tamil while working as a teacher in the St. Theresa convent, Vadakkankulam in the Tirunelveli District. In 1945, he enrolled in the Annamalai University to study Tamil literature. His Masters thesis was on Sangam literature and was titled "Nature in ancient Tamil Poetry". After finishing his studies, he embarked on a worldwide tour to promote Tamil language and literature. He lectured on these subjects in Japan, Chile, Brazil, Peru, Mexico, Ecuador and America. During his tour, he searched the European libraries for medieval Tamil manuscripts and identified several early Tamil printed books. Cartilha (1556), Tambiran Vanakkam (1578), Kirisitiani Vanakkam (1579) and the first Tamil-Portuguese dictionary, compiled by Antem de Proenca are a few of them. He founded a quarterly academic journal called Tamil Studies and ran it till 1966. During 1961–66, he served as the Dean, Faculty of Arts and as head of the Indian studies department at the University of Malaya.

In 1964, Thaninayagam along with Kamil Zvelebil and V. I. Subramaniam convened a meeting of Tamil scholars attending the Oriental scholars conference at New Delhi and formed the International Association for Tamil Research (IATR). He was also instrumental in organising the first World Tamil Conference at Kuala Lumpur in 1966. IATR went on to become the primary body directing research in all fields related to Tamil and has since organised seven more such conferences. Leaving Malaysia in 1969, Thaninayagam taught at the universities of Paris and Naples before retiring and returning home to Sri Lanka.

Thaninayagam died in 1980. The University of Jaffna conferred an honorary doctorate on him after his death.
