= William Henry Curry =

American conductor and composer (born 1954)

- Born: June 30, 1954; Pittsburgh, Pennsylvania, U.S.
- Occupations: Conductor; composer
- Website: www.whcurrymusic.com

William Henry Curry (born June 30, 1954) is an American conductor and composer. Since 2009 he has been the music director of Durham Symphony Orchestra.

== Life and career ==
Willam Henry Curry was born in Pittsburgh on June 30, 1954. He started conducting and composing at the age of 14. After studying viola and conducting at Oberlin Conservatory from 1972 to 1974, he became assistant conductor of the Richmond Symphony (1975–1977).

Curry has conducted, inter alia, Indianapolis Symphony, Baltimore Symphony, NC Symphony and the St. Paul Chamber Orchestra. He has won the Stokowski award for conductors. In 2019, he collaborated with Composer Raleigh Rajan for the classical Tamil poetry, Yathum Oore (Circa 200B.C.), the theme song of 10th World Tamil Conference.

According to Grove Music Online, Curry's compositions have been described as "melodic, neo-romantic, and populist", while "[h]is composing influences include Aaron Copland, Roy Harris, and Samuel Barber."
