= Svadhya =

Janya raga of Carnatic music

- Arohanam: S R₁ M₁ P N₂ Ṡ
- Avarohanam: Ṡ N₂ D₁ P M₁ R₁ S

Svadhya is a rāgam in Carnatic music (musical scale of South Indian classical music). It is an audava Shadava rāgam . It is a janya rāgam (derived scale), as it does not have all the seven swaras (musical notes).

It is said to evoke intense self-reflection to the listener and Karuṇa rasa (pathos).

== Structure and Lakshana ==
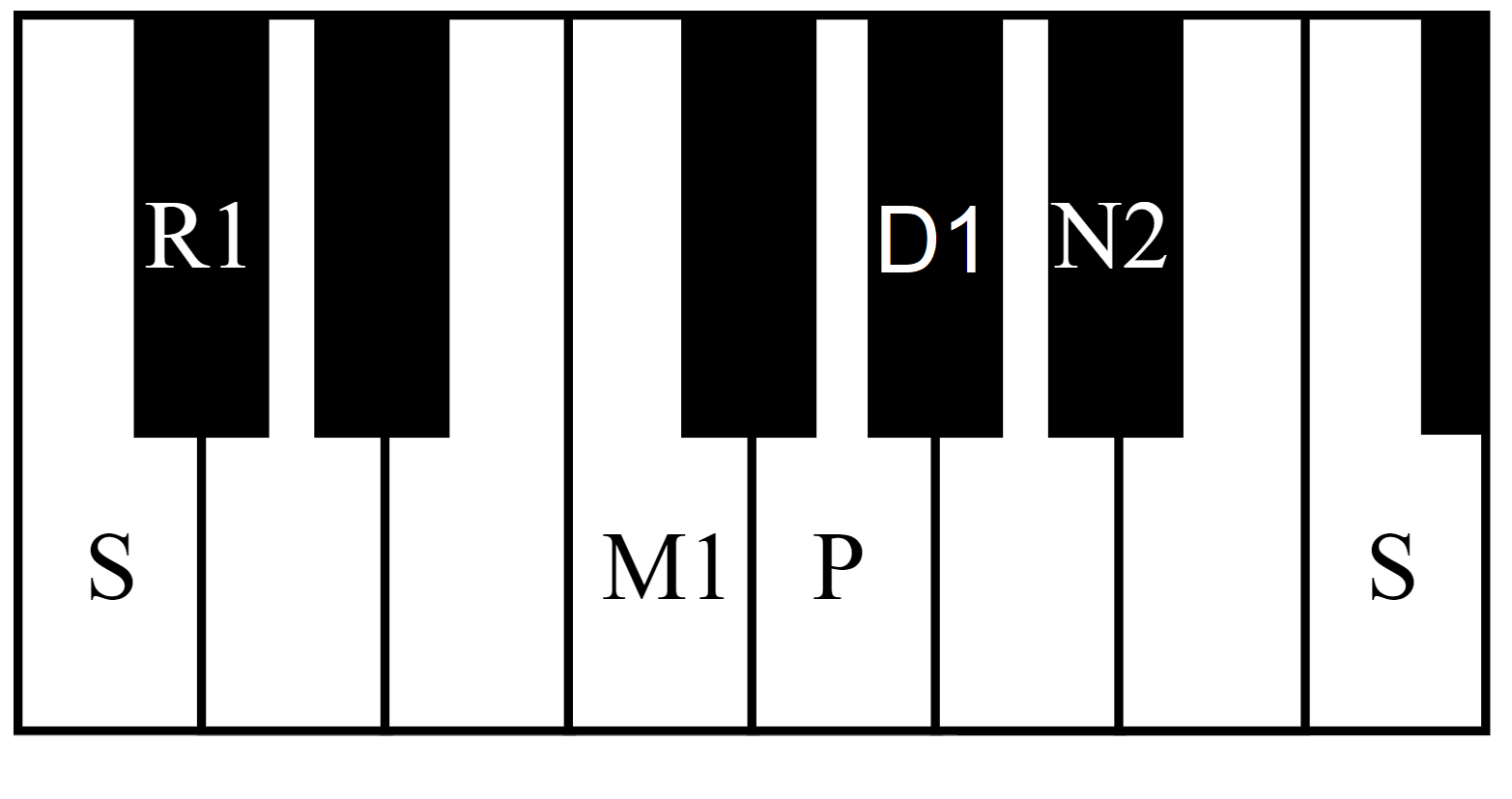
Svadhya scale with shadjam at C, *D1 (D1 only in avarohanam)

- ārohaṇa : S R₁ M₁ P N₂ Ṡ (Note: Alternate notations: Hindustani: S Ṟ M P Ṉ Ṡ; Western: C D♭ F G B♭ C)
- avarohaṇa : Ṡ N₂ D₁ P M₁ R₁ S (Note: Alternate notations: Hindustani: Ṡ Ṉ Ḏ P M Ṟ S; Western: C B♭ A♭ G F D♭ C)

(notes used in this scale are shuddha rishabham, shuddha madhyamam, panchamam, shuddha dhaivatham, kaisiki nishadham)

Svadhya is considered a janya rāgam of Ratnangi, the 2nd Melakarta rāgam. This Raga was created by composer Raleigh Rajan.

== Popular compositions ==
Here are some popular kritis composed in Svadhya.

- Maya- The Reflection of Self by Raleigh Rajan
- Ashtavakra Gita- Self Realization Musical by Raleigh Rajan

== Related rāgams ==
This section covers the theoretical and scientific aspect of this rāgam.

=== Scale similarities ===
- Revati ragam has similar aurohana but a different avarohana, especially the presence of shuddha dhaivatham makes Svadhya raga a complex one and lends a different colour.
