= Radhakamal Mukerjee =

Indian thinker and social scientist

- Native name: রাধাকমল মুখার্জী
- Born: 7 December 1889 Berhampore, Murshidabad district, Bengal Presidency, British India (now West Bengal, India)
- Died: 24 August 1968 (aged 78)

Radhakamal Mukerjee (7 December 1889 – 24 August 1968) was an Indian social scientist who was Professor of Economics and Sociology and Vice-Chancellor of the University of Lucknow.

Mukerjee played an important and constructive role in the Indian independence movement. He was a 1962 recipient of the third highest Indian civilian honour of the Padma Bhushan.

== Early life and education ==
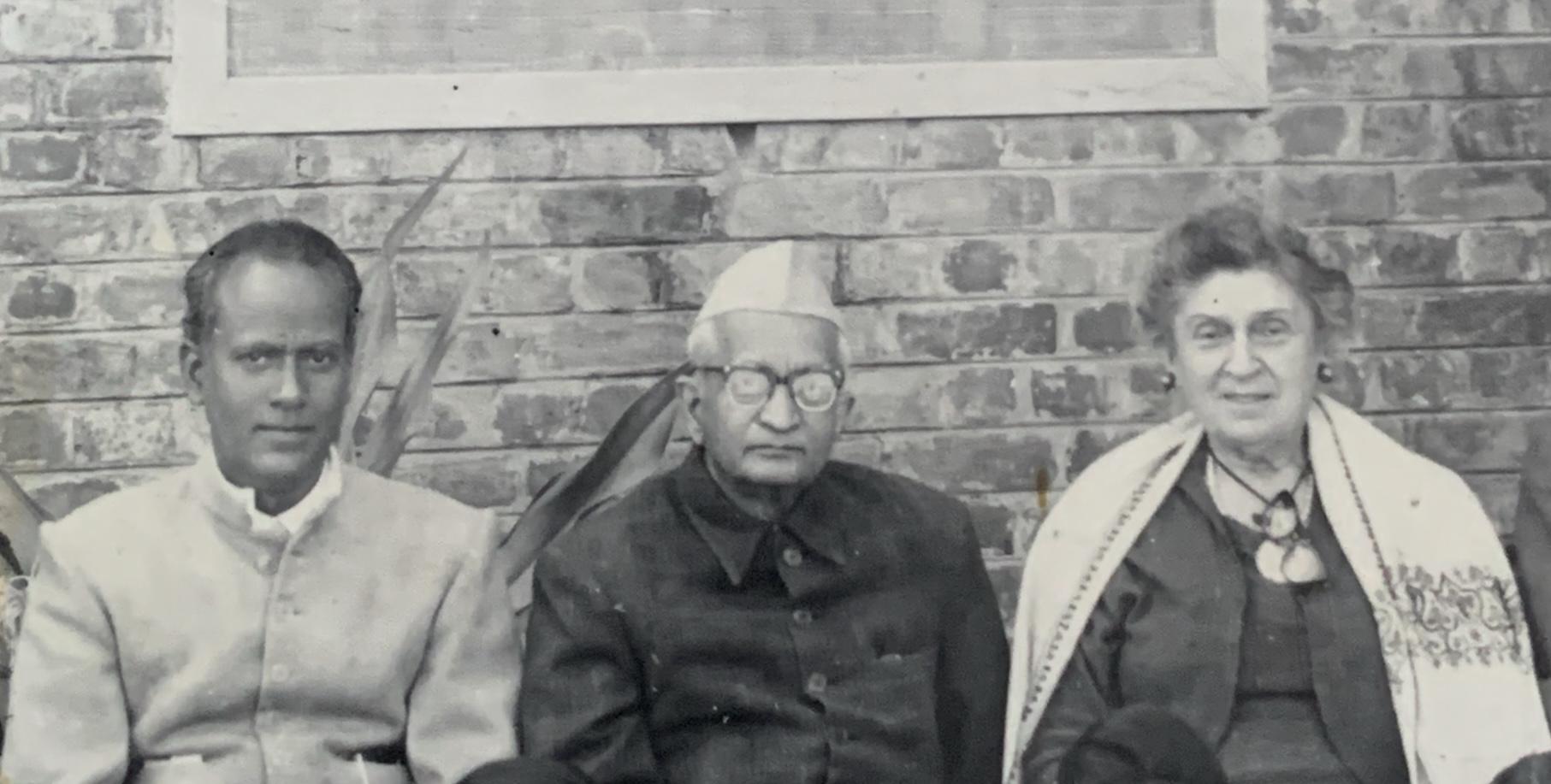
Kedar Nath Srivastava, Radhakamal Mukerjee, Welthy Honsinger Fisher

Mukerjee was the son of a barrister in Baharampur, West Bengal, a city located some 185 km north of Kolkata. He grew up in a household with a scholarly focus and a library devoted to history, literature, the law and Sanskrit texts. After attending Krishnanagar College, he gained an academic scholarship to Presidency College, under the University of Calcutta. He earned his PhD in 1920 from University of Calcutta.

He earned his honours degrees in English and History.

== Academic career ==
He was Professor in the Department of Economics and Sociology at Lucknow University from 1921 to 1952.

Mukerjee emphasized interdisciplinary disciplinary approach towards the understanding of life. Mukerjee sought to break the barriers between physical sciences and sciences relating to persons aspects. Mukerjee was a pioneer of Sociology in the 1900s.

He authored The Institutional Theory of Economics.

Mukherjees theory of society sought to explain the values of civilization. In sense, Radhakamal was a pioneer of transdisciplinary approach in science.

Mukerjee opened the discourse of the Ashtavakra Gita into English with his posthumous work published in 1971.
