= Kaniyan Pungundranar =

Tamil philosopher

- Born: Uncertain; probably around 6th century BCE. Mahibalanpatti, Sivaganga district, Tamil Nadu, India

Philosophical work
- Region: Mahibalanpatti, Sivaganga district, Tamil Nadu, India
- Main interests: Ethics, ahimsa, justice, virtue, politics, education, family, friendship, love
- Notable works: Purananuru; Naṟṟiṇai
- Notable ideas: Common ethics and morality

Kaniyan Poongunranar, also Poongundranar or Pungundranar (Tamil: கணியன் பூங்குன்றனார், Kaṇiyaṉ Pūṅkuṉṟaṉār), was an influential Tamil Just World philosopher from the Sangam age from around 6th century BCE. His name Kaniyan implies that he was an Kaala Kanithar (astronomer) (kaala kanitham in Tamil literally means mathematics of date, time and place). Kaniyan was born and brought up in Mahibalanpatti, a village panchayat in Tamil Nadu's Sivaganga district. He composed two poems in Purananuru and Natrinai.

== Purananuru (Verse 192) ==
Tamil	Tamil Romanization	English Paraphrase
யாதும் ஊரே யாவரும் கேளிர்	Yātum ūrē yāvarum kēḷir	Every city is your city. Everyone is your kin.
தீதும் நன்றும் பிறர்தர வாரா	tītum naṉṟum piṟartara vārā	We are responsible for our own success or failure, not others!
நோதலும் தணிதலும் அவற்றோ ரன்ன	nōtalum taṇitalum avaṟṟō raṉṉa	Nor do suffering and end of suffering.
சாதலும் புதுவது அன்றே,	cātalum putuvatu aṉṟē,	There is nothing new in death.
வாழ்தல் இனிதென மகிழ்ந்தன்றும் இலமே முனிவின்	vāḻtal iṉiteṉa makiḻntaṉṟum ilamē muṉiviṉ	Thinking that living is sweet, we do not rejoice in it.
இன்னா தென்றலும் இலமே, மின்னொடு	iṉṉā teṉṟalum ilamē, miṉṉoṭu	Even less do we say, that to live is miserable!
வானம் தண்துளி தலைஇ யானாது	vāṉam taṇtuḷi talai'iyāṉātu	Through the vision of those who have understood
கல் பொருது மிரங்கு மல்லல் பேரியாற்று	kal porutu miraṅku mallal pēriyāṟṟu	we know that life, with its hardship, makes its way like a raft
நீர்வழிப் படூஉம் புணைபோல் ஆருயிர்	nīrvaḻip paṭū'um puṇaipōl āruyir	riding the water of a huge and powerful river roaring
முறை வழிப் படூஉம் என்பது திறவோர்	muṟai vaḻip paṭū'um eṉpatu tiṟavōr	without pause as it breaks against rocks because the clouds
காட்சியில் தெளிந்தனம் ஆகலின், மாட்சியின்	kāṭciyil teḷintaṉam ākaliṉ, māṭciyiṉ	crowded with bolts of lightning pour down their cold drops of rain,
பெரியோரை வியத்தலும் இலமே,	periyōrai viyattalum ilamē,	and so we are not amazed at those who are great,
சிறியோரை இகழ்தல் அதனினும் இலமே	ciṟiyōrai ikaḻtal ataṉiṉum ilamē	even less do we despise the weak!

=== Themes ===
==== Cosmopolitanism ====
Poongundranar rejected division of mankind into various categories and emphasised the universality of all humans. The Tamil bards and intellectuals of the time of Poongundranar and those preceding his age considered that all humans, whatever their rank or station in life, were alike.

==== Natural law ====
Poongundranar states that the wooden log is carried by the water in its direction and similarly postulates that everything in life will also follow karma. This he calls 'Way of Order'(Tamil: முறை வழி, muṟai vazhi).

==== Principles of the Way of Order ====
Throughout his poem, Poongundranar lays down the principles of his version of natural law. The first part of the poem deals with the basic principles of the 'Way of Order'(Tamil: முறை வழி, muṟai vazhi) which is his term for natural law.

- Every human of every town is of the same value because they are கேளிர் (related). Hence, all people should be bound by one, same moral and legal code.
- நன்று (good) and தீது (evil) do not come from others. Hence, humans are liable for both the pleasure and suffering they feel.
- Death is a natural part of the cycle of life, it is not new. Hence, this life must be made use of to its full potential.

==== Allegory of the raft ====
Poongundranar further goes onto explain these principles with an example of a raft.

- He compares birth to lightning, suggesting it can happen spontaneously anywhere.
- He gives an example of a raft which is allegorical to human life going downstream a steep hill, having a perilous journey through boulders and faces its climax just as in திறவோர் காட்சியில் (lit. Wisemen's vision means fate) which is death.
- He concludes that since everyone's life is like the raft's journey, it is irrational to magnify the பெரியோ[ர்] (accomplished people) and even worse to diminish சிறியோ[ர்](less accomplished people), because everyone goes through similar tribulations whatever their social estate might be.

=== Influence ===
Poongundranar was extremely influential in the revivalist Self-respect movement. The sentence "Yaadhum Oore Yaavarum Kelir" has been adopted as the motto of the World Thamizh Confederation to represent Tamil people.

The quote "Yaadhum Oore Yaavarum Kelir" is at present depicted in the United Nations Organisation. G. G. Ponnambalam concluded his 1966 address to the 21st session of the United Nations General Assembly by invoking this quote. A. P. J Abdul Kalam was the first one to quote this famous quote in European Union Historical Speech by Abdul Kalam in European Union, another one is Narendra Modi who quoted it in 74th Session of the UN General Assembly.

The first musical form of Yaadhum Oore poem was composed by composer Raleigh Rajan and was chosen as the theme song of 10th World Tamil Conference. It has been sung by Academy nominated singer Bombay Jayashri and Karthik (singer) among other international artists. It was part of the album Sandham: Symphony Meets Classical Tamil and became commercially successful, featuring in Amazon's Top#10 International Music albums.

== Natrinai (Verse 226) ==
Tamil	Tamil Romanization	English Paraphrase
"மரஞ்சா மருந்தும் கொள்ளார் மாந்தர் உரம் சாச் செய்யார் உயர்தவம் வளம் கெடப் பொன்னும் கொள்ளார் மன்னர் நன்னுதல் நாந்தம் உண்மையின் உளமே அதனால் தாம் செய் பொருளன அறியார் தாம் கசிந்து என்றூழ் நிறுப்ப நீளிடை ஒழியச் சென்றோர் மன்ற நம் காதலர் என்றும் இன்ன நிலைமைத்து என்ப என்னோரும் அறிப இவ்வுலகத்தானே".	"Marañcā maruntum koḷḷār māntar uram cāc ceyyār uyartavam vaḷam keṭap poṉṉum koḷḷār maṉṉar naṉṉutal nāntam uṇmaiyiṉ uḷamē ataṉāl tām cey poruḷaṉa aṟiyār tām kacintu eṉṟūḻ niṟuppa nīḷiṭai oḻiyac ceṉṟōr maṉṟa nam kātalar eṉṟum iṉṉa nilaimaittu eṉpa eṉṉōrum aṟipa ivvulakattāṉē".	The Hero asks permission from the Lady Love for seeking wealth. The Lady Love refuses. She goes on to explain to her friend who is a good man, who is a good king and what is superior. We are good because he is. (Wouldn't the nut be pleasing if he broke up) So he himself did not realize the usefulness of the thing he was doing. Is he going to go the long way of burning the sweat-soaked sun, is it fair to say I'm been here and my boyfriend went? She says everyone knows that there should be no division, no matter what condition they live in, in the world. Indicates wilting in order of separation.

== See also ==
- Sangam literature
- List of Sangam poets
