= Swami Nityaswarupananda =

Indian monk

Swami Nityaswarupananda (1899–1992) was a monk of Sri Ramakrishna Math. Swami Nityaswarupananda has translated Ashtavakara Gita into English. His biography has been written by Dr. Shelly Brown. He established the Ramakrishna Mission Institute of Culture in Kolkata in 1938.
