= Sandham: Symphony Meets Classical Tamil =

2020 Tamil poetry and symphony album

Studio album by Bombay Jayashri, Saindhavi, Karthik, Pragathi Guruprasad, Priyanka, William Henry Curry, Raleigh Rajan
- Released: 2020
- Recorded: 2019
- Genre: World
- Length: 30:55
- Producer: Raleigh Rajan

Sandham: Symphony Meets Classical Tamil is a studio album in Tamil by Indian American composer Raleigh Rajan that involved various international artists. It is based on Sangam period ancient Tamil poetry and the first ever music album on Sangam poetry. As of 2019, the album got into Amazon's Top #10 best seller list under International Music category.

The album consists of seven songs, a collection of outstanding ancient Tamil Sangam literature poetry with music composed by Raleigh Rajan and sung by leading singers Bombay Jayashri, Saindhavi, Karthik, Pragathi Guruprasad among others. The seven songs in the album are, Yathum Oore, written by Kaniyan Pungundranar having two versions (Symphony version and multi-genre version), Veral veli, written by Poet Kapilar, Yayum Nyayum written by Sempulapeyaneerar, Nyayiru Kayathu, written by Poet Kayamanar, Mullai Oorntha written by poet Okkur Masathiar and Kalamsei kove written by an unknown Sangam period poet. North Carolina–based Durham Symphony led by William Henry Curry played the composition. Recordings happened in multiple locations across the world including Raleigh-Durham, Los Angeles, Chennai, Kyiv- Ukraine, Jerusalem, Beijing, Rome, London and Mumbai.

Composer Rajan mentioned that Yathum Oore being one of the oldest poem that talks about equality, unity and global citizenship, he composed the song to include 14 genres of musical styles including Indian classical, Western classical, rock, country, pop, calypso, Chinese and Japanese, reggae, rap, Middle Eastern, East Asian and Cuban.

== Background ==
Written between 600BC-200AD, the poems of the Tamil Sangam period are appreciated for their poetic value, vision, metaphors and technique. Though these poems are widely discussed in the academia as well as in popular media, there is no known musical form for Sangam poems. Composer Rajan mentioned that when he read a book titled Sanga Chithirangal by writer Jeyamohan, he fell in love with those poems and tried to find any known musical forms. When he found that there were no albums or singles on any of the sangam poems, he tried to compose the first ever album on sangam poetry.

About his unique style of music, he mentioned that he tried to bring in the best of three worlds- the melody of Indian classical music, Orchestration of western classical music and rhythms of tribal/ folk music.

== Track listing ==
Track name	Singer(s)	Sangam Poetry	Duration
Yayum Nyayum	Karthik, Pragathi Guruprasad	Kuruntokai, 40 by Sempulapeyaneerar	3:55
Veral Veli	Bombay Jayashri	Kuruntokai, 18 by Kapilar	4:58
Njayiru Kayathu	Rajalakshmee Sanjay	Kuruntokai, 378 by Kayamanar	4:32
Mullai Oorntha	NK Priyanka, Raleigh Rajan	Kuruntokai 275 by Okkur Masathiyar	4:49
Yathum Oore Anthem	Karthik, Bombay Jayashri	Purananuru, 192 by Kanian Poongunranar	5:00
KalamSei Kove	Saindhavi	Purananuru, 258 by Unknown poet	3:40
Yaadhum Oore Symphony	Karthik	Purananuru, 192 by Kanian Poongunranar	3:50

== Album credits ==
- Raleigh Rajan – Composer, Producer
- William Henry Curry – Conductor, Arranger
- Bombay Jayashri – Singer
- Karthik – Singer
- Saindhavi – Singer
- Pragathi Guruprasad – Singer
- Priyanka – Singer
- Durham Symphony – Orchestra
- Kaniyan Pungundranar – Poet
- Kapilar – Poet
- Sempulapeyaneerar – Poet
- Okkur Masathiyar – Poet
- Kayamanar – Poet
- Steven Raets – Mixing and Mastering
