= Jayakumar =

Jayakumar or Jeyakumar is an Indian and Sinhalese surname. It consists of two parts: jaya, which means victory in Sanskrit and is also the name of a Hindu demigod, and kumar, meaning child, son or prince. The name may refer to the following notable people:

- K. Jayakumar, Indian civil servant
- R. V. Jayakumar, Indian doctor and Professor of endocrinology
- S. Jayakumar (Singaporean politician), Singaporean Member of Parliament
- S. Jayakumar (Indian politician), Indian Member of Legislative Assembly
- K. Jeyakumar, Indian politician
- Michael Jeyakumar Devaraj, Malaysian politician
