= Chicago Tamil Sangam =

US nonprofit organization

- Abbreviation: CTS
- Formation: 1969
- Type: Non-profit Organization
- Region served: Chicago
- Official language: Tamil
- Website: chicagotamilsangam.org

Chicago Tamil Sangam (CTS) was established in August 1969 and is the oldest Tamil Sangam in the US. The organization was created with the objective of keeping the Tamil language, culture and its rich heritage an integral part in the daily lives of thousands of Tamils living in the Chicago metropolitan area. CTS has driven continually in establishing a community presence for Tamils by getting directly involved in literary, cultural, charitable and social activities.

The organization fosters the promotion of Tamil values, art and language. It also provides a forum for the next generation Tamils to participate, learn and grow in the rich heritage of the Tamil culture.

== Activities ==
Chicago Tamil Sangam organizes 6 to 8 events every year:

- Pongal Vizha
- Muthamizh Vizha
- Sports Day
- Ilakkiya Maalai
- Summer Picnic
- Service Day at FMSC
- Adopt a Highway Cleanup
- Music Concert
- Children's Day
- Viyakka Vaikkum Thamizh(New Program Introduced in 2020)

== Performing Arts ==
Chicago Tamil Sangam conducts classes for the below performing arts:

- Pon Parai
- Silambam
- Oyilaattam and Devaraattam

== Organization ==
The organization was founded in 1969 and is the oldest Tamil sangam in USA. The organization will be celebrating the golden jubilee in 2019.

== World Tamil Conference ==
Chicago Tamil Sangam along with Federation of Tamil Sangams in North America will be hosting the 10th World Tamil Conference. The International Conference - Seminar on Tamil Studies has been approved by the International Association for Tamil Research to be held on July 4-7, 2019 in Schaumburg, Illinois USA.
