= Katsura Shinnosuke =

Japanese musician (1952–2020)

- 桂 伸乃介
- Born: Hiroshi Tsutagawa; 16 May 1952; Shibuya, Japan
- Died: 1 January 2020 (aged 67); Itabashi, Tokyo
- Occupation: Rakugoka

Katsura Shinnosuke (桂 伸乃介, 16 May 1952 – 1 January 2020) was a Japanese rakugoka and musician who performed the works of Katsura Bunji X and performed in the jazz band Newoirans.

== Biography ==
Katsura Shinnosuke was born Hiroshi Tsutagawa (伝川博, Tsutagawa Hiroshi) on 16 May 1952 in Shibuya, Tokyo. He became the disciple of Katsura Bunji X (then Katsura Shinji II) in October 1970 and adopted the name Katsura Hiroji (桂ひろ治). He adopted the name Katsura Shinnosuke in April 1976 after being promoted to futatsume, and was promoted to star performer in May 1986.

His performances of his first master's works were described as "clever" and "indispensable". He was a member of the rakugo jazz band Newoirans, for whom he was the pianist. His rakugo performances included Chōtan, Rokurokkubi, and Sanada Kozō, and Chihaya Furu was his final performance on 14 December 2019.

Katsura was admitted to the Itabashi Hospital at the Nihon University School of Medicine, where he died on 1 January 2020, aged 67, from acute myeloid leukemia.

=== Personal life ===
He married Yūko (悠子).
