= Vyadha Gita =

Hindu teachings within the Mahabharata

The Vyadha Gita (meaning, songs of a butcher) is a part of the epic Mahabharata and consists of the teachings imparted by a vyadha (butcher) to a sannyasin (monk). It occurs in the Vana Parva section of Mahabharata and is told to Yudhishthira, a Pandava by sage Markandeya. In the story, an arrogant sannyasin is humbled by a vyadha (butcher or hunter), and learns about dharma (righteousness). The vyadha teaches that "no duty is ugly, no duty is impure" and it is only the way in which the work is done, determines its worth. The Bhagavata Purana mentions the vyadha as an example of someone who attained perfection through satsang (association with devotees of Lord Vishnu or Krishna). Scholar Satya P. Agarwal considers Vyadha Gita to be one of the popular narrations in the Mahabharata.

== Story ==
The story has only three characters—a brahmin sannyasi, a housewife and a vyadha (butcher). The story begins with a young sannyasi going to a forest, where he meditates and practices spiritual austerities for a long time. After years of practice, one day while sitting under a tree, dry leaves fall on his head because of a fight between a crow and a crane. The angry sannyasi had developed yogic powers and burnt the birds with his mere look. This incident fills the sannyasin with arrogance. Shortly thereafter, he goes to a house, begging for food. Here the housewife who was nursing her sick husband requests the sannyasi to wait. To this, the sannyasi thinks, "You wretched woman, how dare you make me wait! You do not know my power yet", to which the housewife says that she is neither a crow nor a crane, to be burnt. The sannyasi is amazed and asks her how she came to know about the bird. The housewife says that she did not practice any austerities and by doing her duty with cheerfulness and wholeheartedness, she became illumined and thus could read his thoughts. She redirects him to a dharma-vyadha (meaning, the righteous butcher) in the town of Mithilā and says that the dharma-vyadha would answer all his questions on dharma. The sannyasi goes to see the vyadha and overcoming his initial hesitation, listens to his teachings, which is referred to as Vyadha Gita—and even puts them into practice.

== Teachings ==
The surprised sannyasi asks the vyadha as to how he could become illumined by doing a "filthy, ugly work". The vyadha says that he is working as per the principles of karma, which placed him in a circumstance into which he is born.

The vyadha further advises, "no duty is ugly, no duty is impure" and it is only the way in which the work is done, determines its worth.

The vyadha advises that all work must be done by "dedicating to God" and by sincere and unattached performance of the allotted duty one can become illumined. The vyadha advises the sannyasi that ahimsa (non-violence) and satya (truth) are two main pillars of dharma through which the highest good of all can be achieved. He says that a decision on what is true under difficult circumstances should be made by sticking to that course of action which leads to the highest good of beings. The vyadha, teaches that not birth but dharma and virtuous conduct makes one a Brahmana.

The story describes the importance of performance of swadharma (prescribed duty or duty in life). According to the story, a Vyadha, considered low by birth, but engaged in dharma and doing good to others is capable of teaching a Brahmana, considered higher by birth, but practices austerities for his own good. The attainment of freedom, by the performance of swadharma, is also one of the central teachings of the Bhagavad Gita. Philosopher Swami Vivekananda, describes the Vyadha Gita in one of his lectures in Karma Yoga and says that it contains one of the "highest flights of the Vedanta".
