= Sonam Tshering Lepcha =

Indian musician (1928–2020)

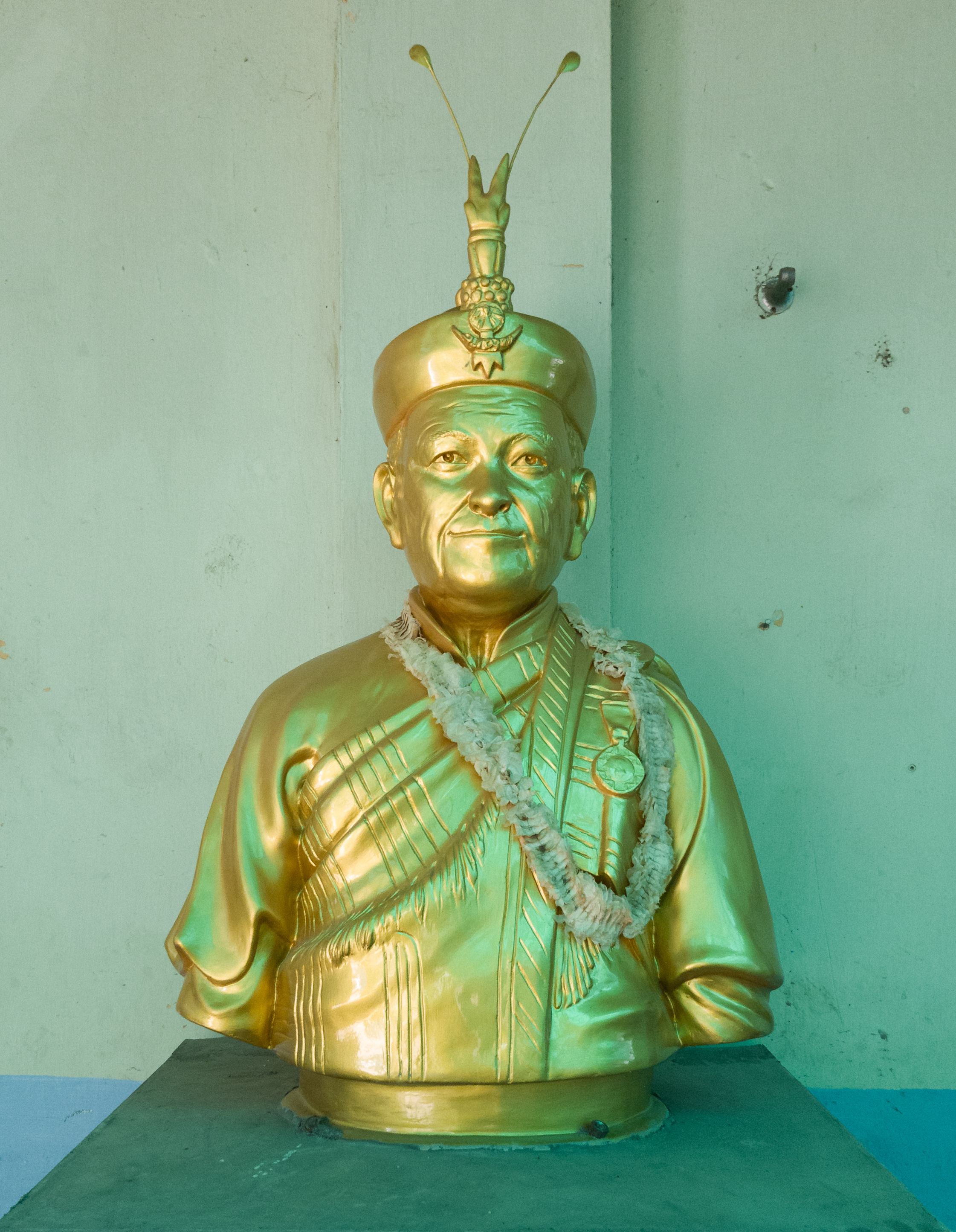
- Statue of Sonam Tshering Lepcha in Kalimpong
- Born: 3 January 1928; Kalimpong, West Bengal, India
- Died: 30 July 2020 (aged 92); Kalimpong, West Bengal, India
- Occupations: Folk musician Lyricist
- Known for: Lepcha folk songs
- Parent: Nimgay Tamsang
- Awards: Padma Shri; Sangeet Natak Akademi Award; Tagore Akademi Ratna Award

Sonam Tshering Lepcha (3 January 1928 – 30 July 2020) was an Indian folk musician, composer and lyricist. He was the first among Lepcha people to air his voice on All India Radio and was credited with the revival of Lepcha culture, one of the indigenous cultures of the Indian state of Sikkim. He was reported to be credited with over 400 folk songs, 102 folk dances and 10 dance dramas. He died on 30 July, 2020 due to cardiac arrest.

== Early life ==
Sonam Tshering was born on 3 January 1928 in Bong Busty, Kalimpong, West Bengal, and started his career as a soldier.

== Career ==
Lepcha travelled in Sikkim, collecting traditional musical instruments and compiling songs and became the first Lepcha to feature on All India Radio in 1960. He is the founder of a museum in Kalimpong which houses several ancient and rare artifacts including indigenous musical instruments, ancient weapons and manuscripts. He received the Sangeet Natak Akademi Award of the Sangeet Natak Akademi in 1995. The Government of India awarded him the fourth highest civilian honour of the Padma Shri, in 2007, for contributions to folk music. In 2011, in connection with the 150th Birthday celebrations of Rabindranath Tagore, Sangeet Natak Akademi selected 100 eminent performing artists of the country and Tshering Lepcha was included in the list of 50 for the Tagore Akademi Ratna Award.

== Gallery ==
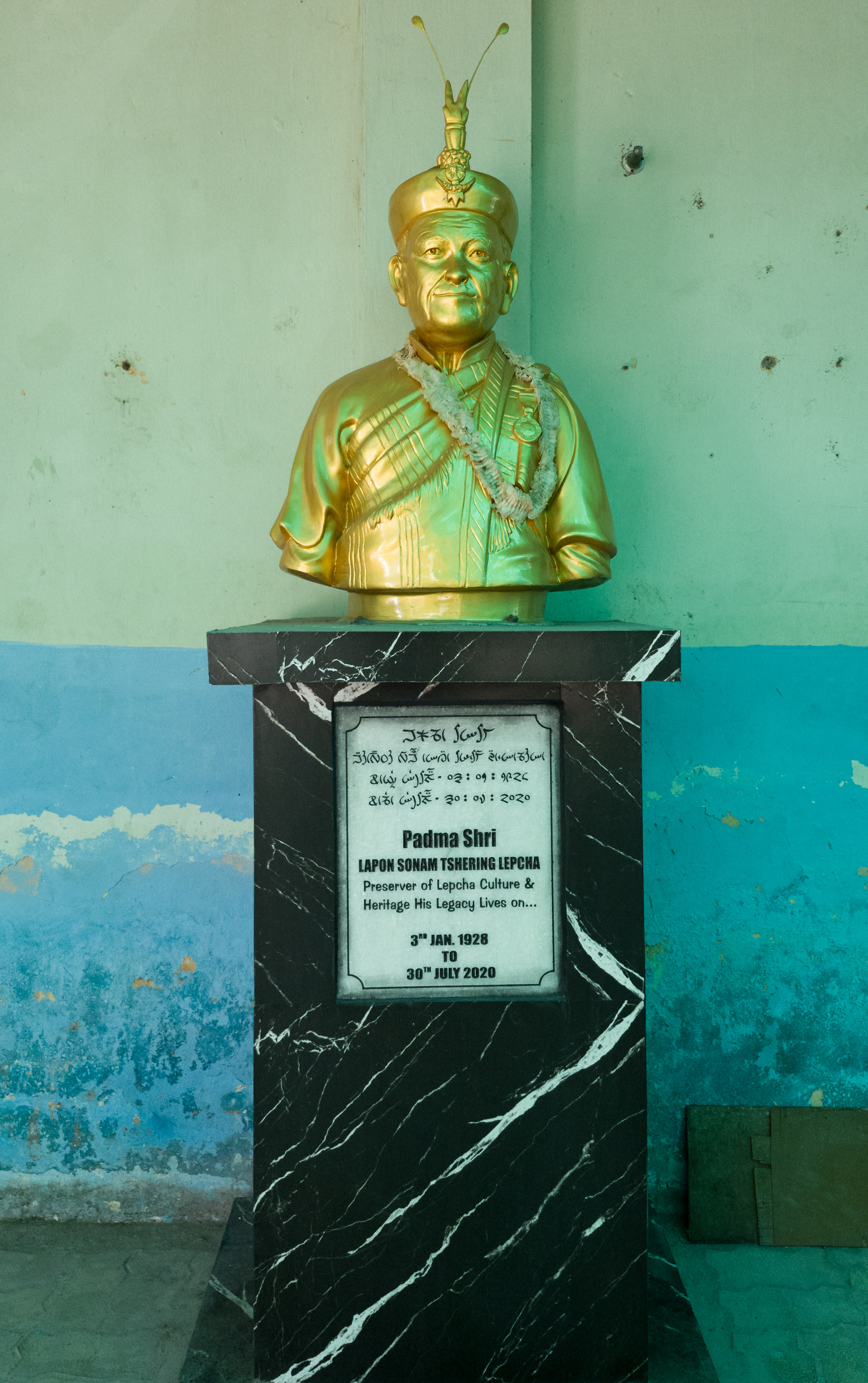
Statue at Lepcha Museum

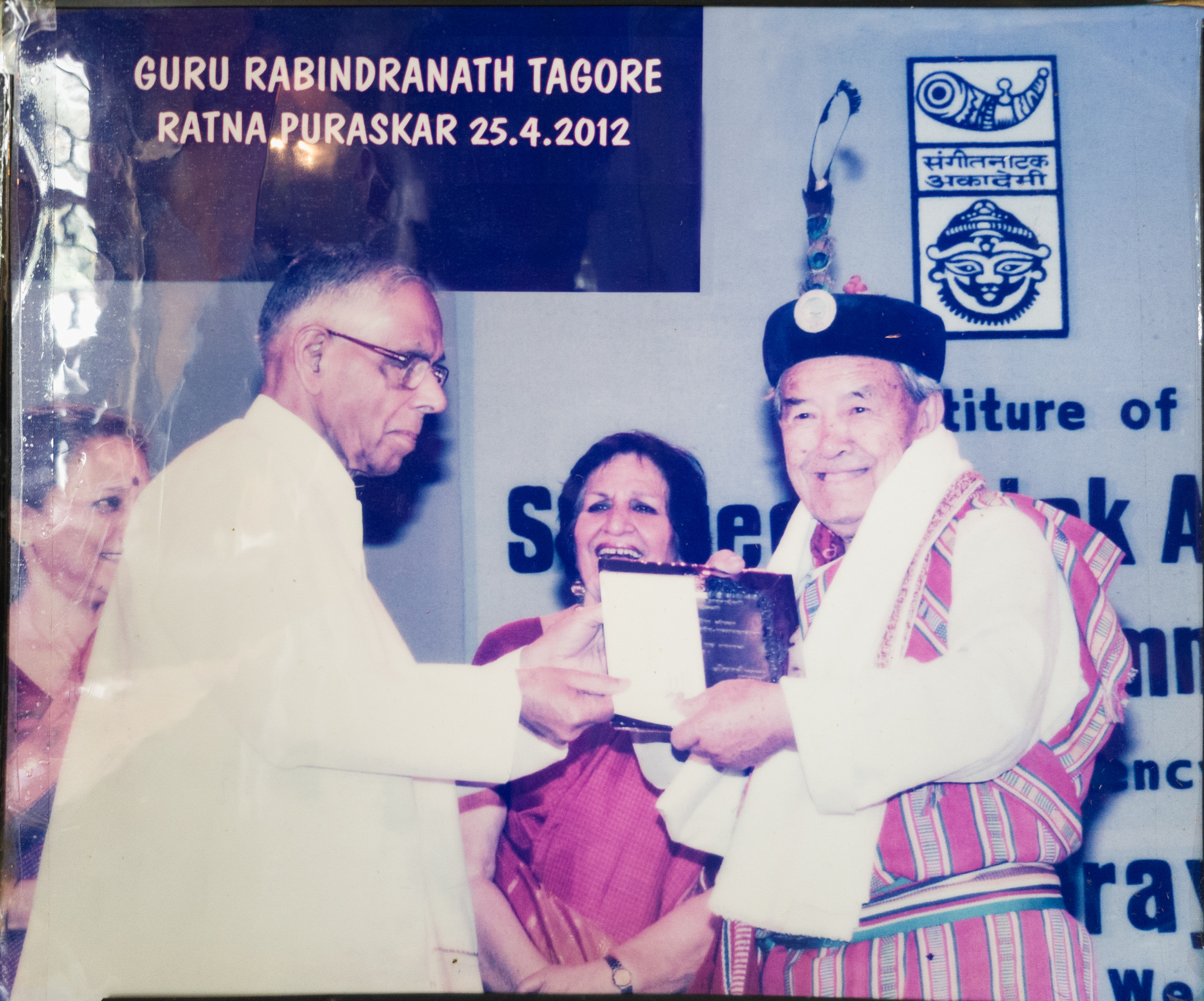
Sonam receiving Guru Rabindranath Tagore Ratna Puraskar

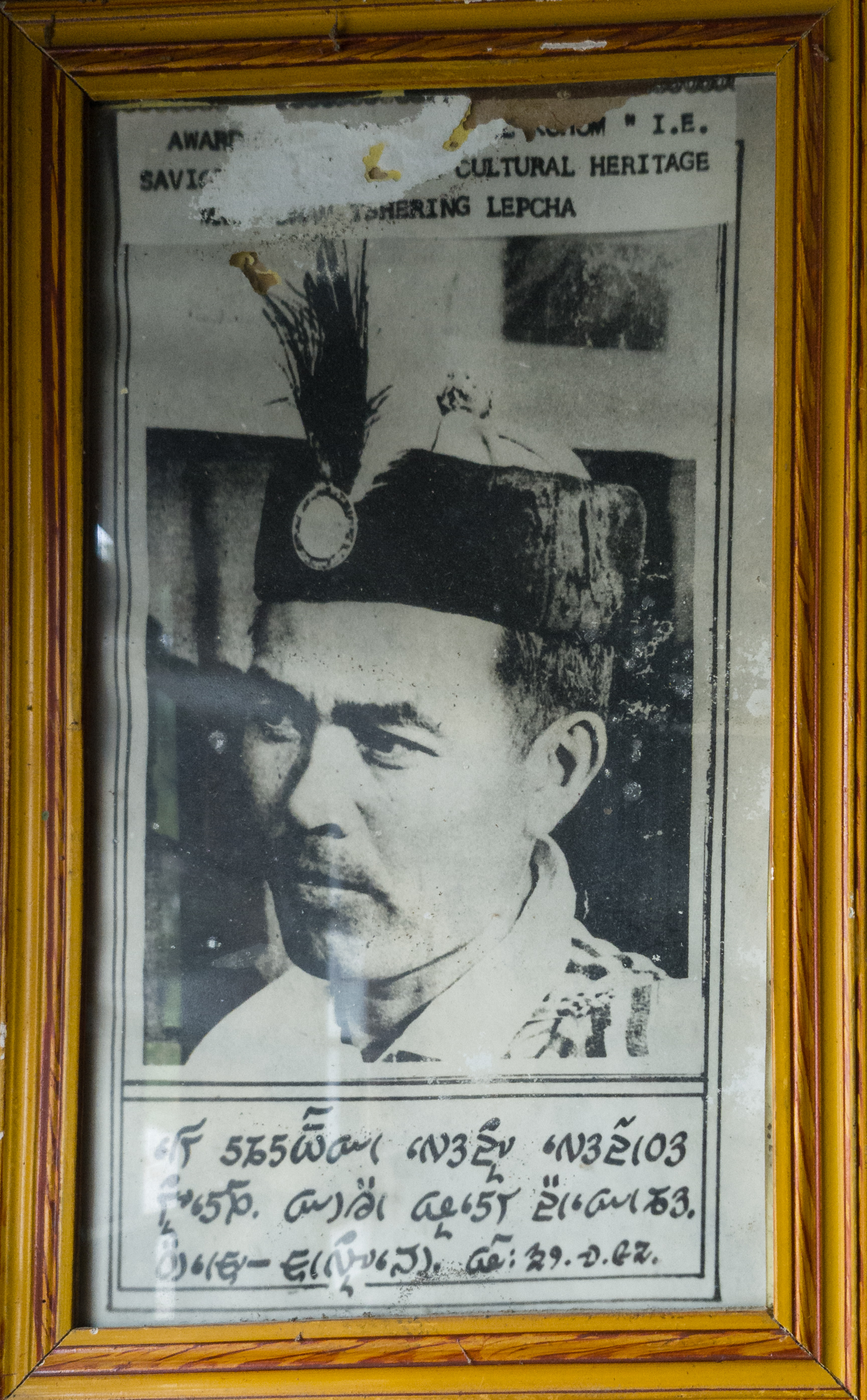
Sonam Tshering Lepcha in 1987

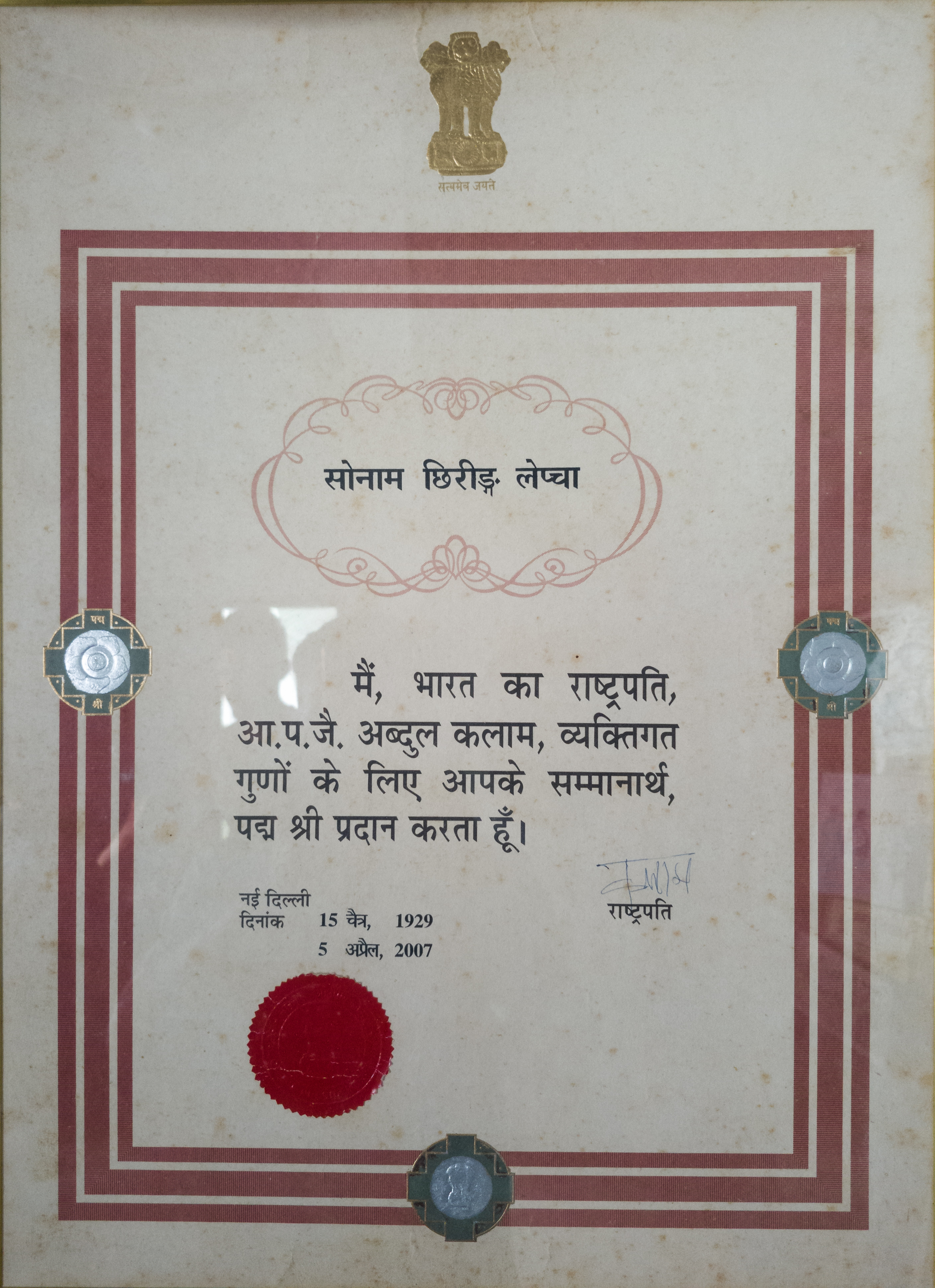
Padma Shri Award Certificate

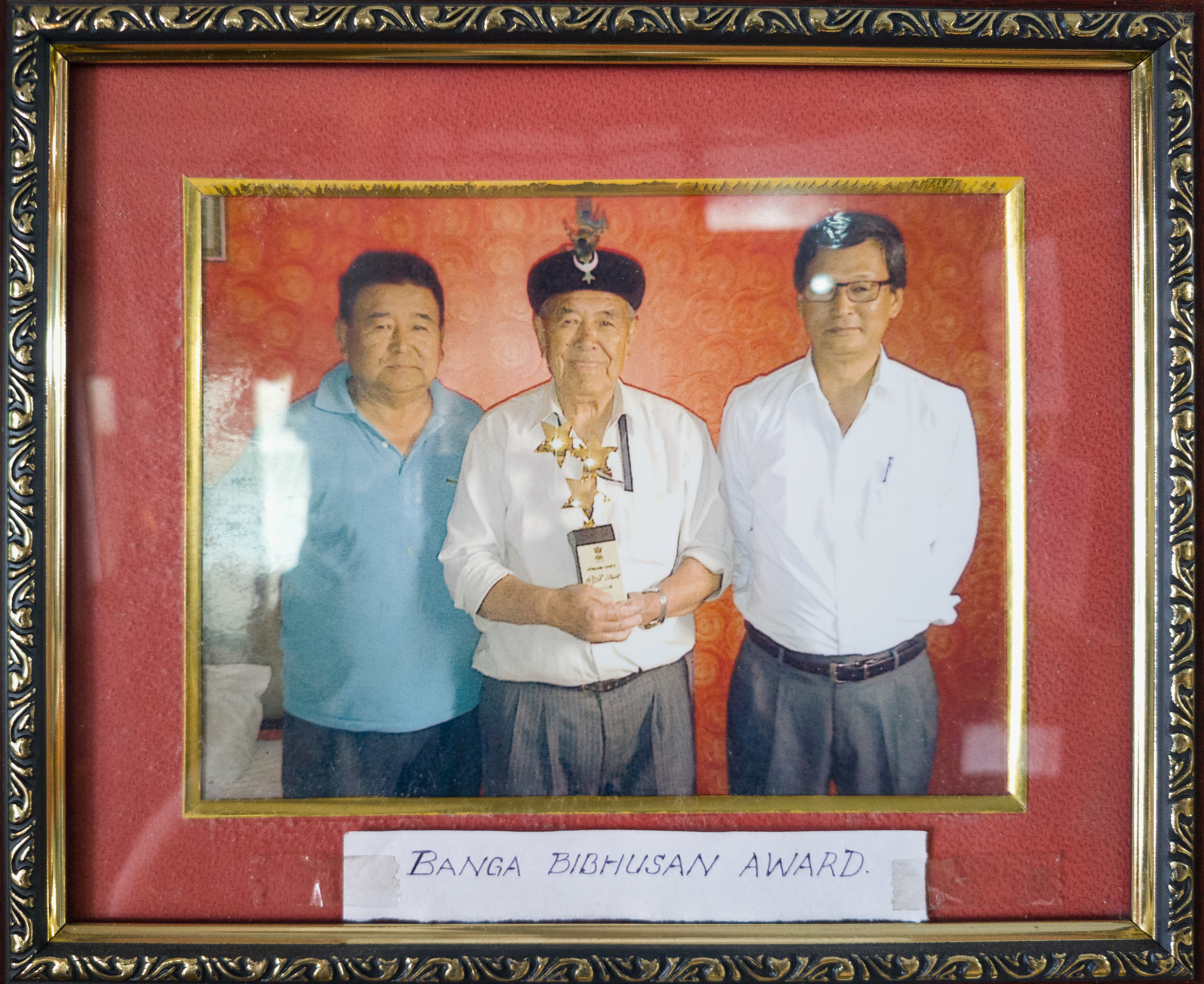
Sonam Tshering receiving Banga Bibhushan Award

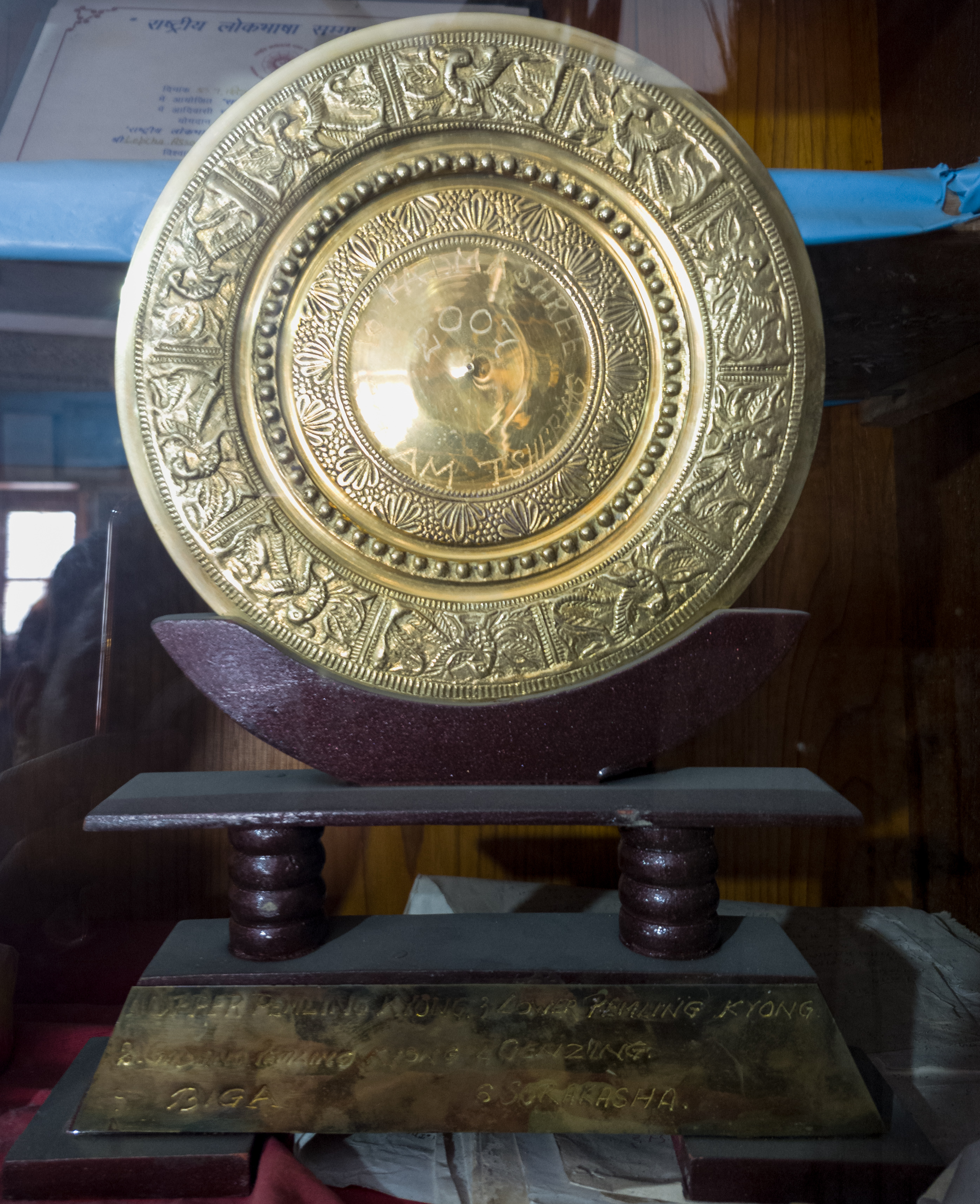
Padma Shri Award

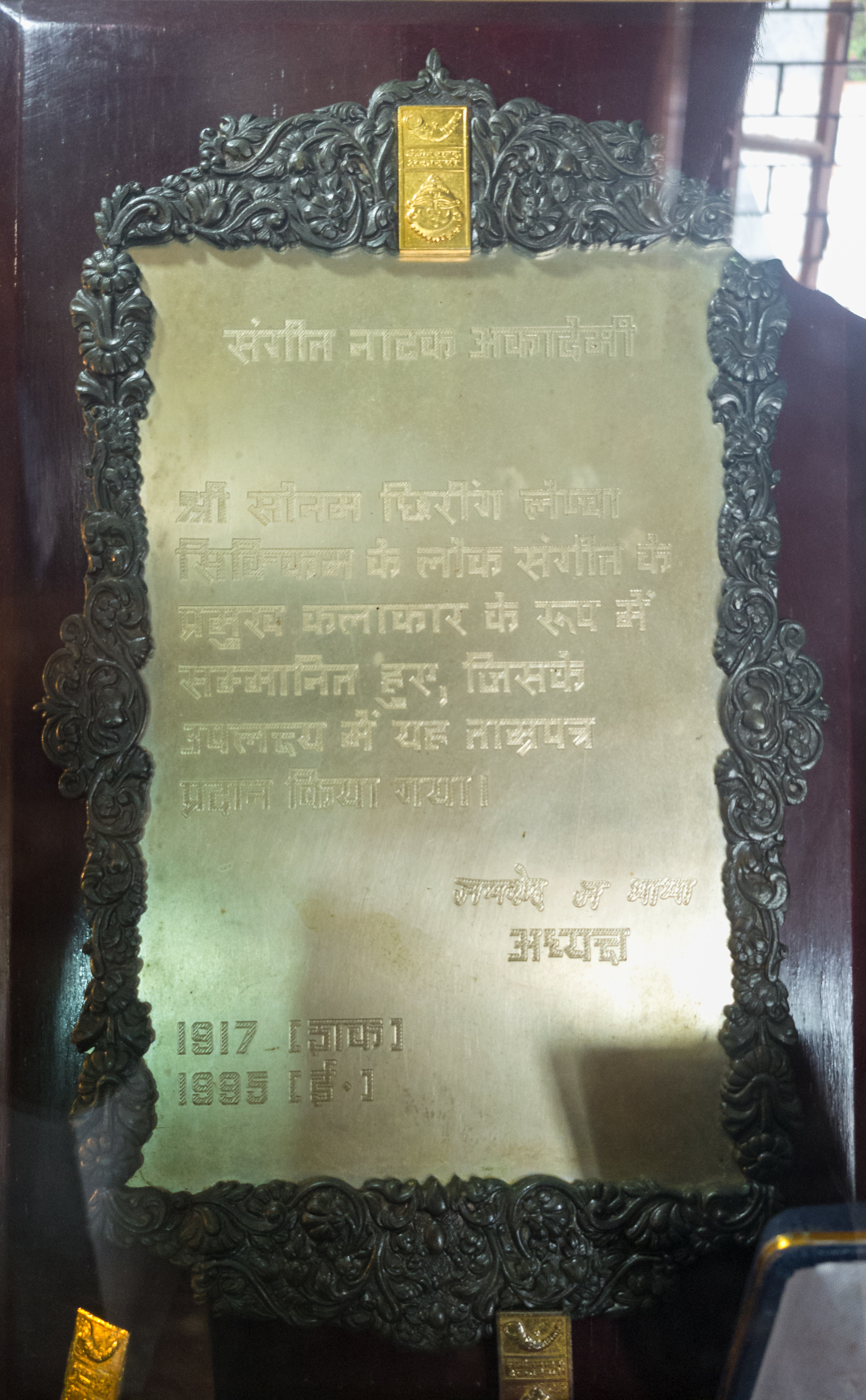
Sangeet Natak Akademi Award

== See also ==
- Lepcha people
