= R. V. Jayakumar =

Indian endocrinologist

R.V. Jayakumar, MD, DM(P.G.I.), FRCP(U.K), M.N.A.M.S. is the former Head of the Department of Medicine, Trivandrum Medical College (1997–2000) and Kottayam Medical College (1996–1997, 2000–2001).

He received his MBBS from Trivandrum Medical College (1963 batch), his MD from Trivandrum Medical College, his DM in Endocrinology from P.G.I. Chandigarh and his MRCP from UK. He became a Fellow of the Royal College of Physicians in 1994. He was the first person in India to pass the MNAMS exam in Endocrinology in 1978. He was the first malayalee to become president of the Endocrine Society of India. He was also the president of the Indian Thyroid Society.
