= World Tamil Conference =

Tamil language conference

The World Tamil Conference (Tamil: உலகத் தமிழ் மாநாடு) is a series of occasional conferences to discuss the social growth of the Tamil language. Each conference is attended by thousands of Tamil enthusiasts around the world. Conferences are hosted in various cities in India, as well as world cities with a significant Tamil population. The conference aims in promoting the heritage of Tamil language

A similar conference called World Classical Tamil Conference 2010, unapproved by the International Association for Tamil Research, was held in Tamil Nadu conducted by the Government of Tamil Nadu under the leadership of M. Karunanidhi. Not all agreed with the academic and intellectual rigour of the latter event. Despite these criticisms upholding such a huge event portraying the value of Tamil language and culture is being appreciated vastly and credited to the DMK supremo as commonly believed by the people in the state of Tamil Nadu. The theme song of the World Classical Tamil conference, Semmozhiyana Thamizh mozhiyam, was composed by Oscar award winner A. R. Rahman. The song was written by M. Karunanidhi where he has used popular quotes from Sangam poetry.

The latest edition of the conference was held on July 3–7, 2019 in Chicago. The 10th conference was jointly hosted by International Association of Tamil Research, Federation of Tamil Sangams in North America (FeTNA) and Chicago Tamil Sangam (CTS). The theme song of the 10th World Tamil Conference was composed by American Composer Raleigh Rajan, titled 'Yaadhum Oore Anthem'. He has composed the first ever musical form for the 2000 year old poetry, Yaadhum Oore, written by Sangam period poet Kaniyan Pungundranar. Rajan mentioned that as a tribute to one of the most progressive ancient poetry that calls for unity and equality, he composed the theme song to cover multiple genres of music and brought in many international musicians of varying genres, ethnicity and languages including academy nominated singer Bombay Jayashri, Karthik and Durham Symphony.

== List of conferences ==
List of conferences
Official title	Host city	Host country	Year	Chief Organizer
1st International Tamil Research Conference	Kuala Lumpur	Malaysia	1966	Fr. Thani Nayagam
2nd International Tamil Research Conference	Chennai	India	1968	M. Bhaktavatsalam and C. N. Annadurai
3rd International Tamil Research Conference	Paris	France	1970	Fr. Thani Nayagam
4th International Tamil Research conference	Jaffna	Sri Lanka	1974	Fr. Thani Nayagam
5th International Tamil Research Conference	Madurai	India	1981	M. G. Ramachandran
6th International Tamil Research Conference	Kuala Lumpur	Malaysia	1987	S. Samy Velu
7th International Tamil Research Conference	Port Louis	Mauritius	1989	Armoogum Parsuramen - Minister of Education, Arts and Culture
8th International Tamil Research Conference	Thanjavur	India	1995	J. Jayalalithaa
9th International Tamil Research Conference	Kuala Lumpur	Malaysia	2015	
10th International Tamil Research Conference	Chicago	USA	2019	International Association for Tamil Research, FeTNA & Chicago Tamil Sangam
11th International Tamil Research Conference	Kuala Lumpur	Malaysia	2023	Nandhan Masilamani, Organising Secretary International Association for Tamil Research-India Branch
12th International Tamil Research Conference	Chennai	India	2025	International Association for Tamil Research, DMK & Government of Tamil Nadu
