= Raleigh Rajan =

- Born: Rajan Somasundaram; Thiruvarur, Tamil Nadu, India
- Genres: Filmi; Indian classical; world music; electronic
- Occupations: Composer; Violinist & Drummer; Music producer Arranger; Songwriter
- Label: Saregama

Raleigh Rajan is an Indian-American composer, music director, and multi-instrumentalist. His international collaborations with artists and American symphony orchestras have gone viral and garnered acclaim. He composed the first music album on two-millennia old Sangam poetry, in collaboration with Durham Symphony Orchestra called Sandham: Symphony Meets Classical Tamil.

== Early life and education ==
Rajan was born in Thiruvarur, Tamil Nadu and started learning Carnatic music since he was 9 years old at the birthplace of Shyama Shastri. He graduated with a master's degree in engineering.

== Career ==
Rajan composed the theme song of the 10th World Tamil Conference scheduled at Chicago. He has composed the first ever musical form for the 2000 year old poetry, Yathum Oore, written by Sangam Period poet Kaniyan Pungundranar. Rajan mentioned that as a tribute to one of the most progressive ancient poetry that calls for unity and equality, he composed the theme song to cover multiple genres of music and brought in many international musicians of varying genres, ethnicity and languages. Singers Karthik and Bombay Jayashri sang the song along with various international artists.

In January 2020, Rajan released the first ever music album on ancient Tamil Sangam poetry collaborating with Durham Symphony and leading international artists, titled Sandham- Symphony Meets Classical Tamil.

Rajan's music for the movie A Tribute to Venmurasu featuring Kamal Haasan amongst others was released by Mani Ratnam in a public event. The movie taken to celebrate the successful completion of World's longest Tamil novel and includes a 12 minute musical tribute sung by Kamal Haasan, Sriram Parthasarathy, Saindhavi and Rajan Somasundaram. Rajan selected some highly poetic lines from Neelam, one of the Venmurasu novels and created this musical tribute.

In 2025, he spearheaded a sold-out, two-hour Carnatic concert based entirely on the Tamil epic Kamba Ramayanam in Dallas. In addition to the traditional mridangam, violin, kanjira and tanpura, he incorporated piano—playing both chords and melodic leads—within traditional Carnatic ragas. The concert also featured poetry appreciation segments before each piece and digital paintings as a visual backdrop, enhancing the overall experience.

In 2026, his independent song Feel The Spark sung by Ciera Dumas went viral.

== Discography ==
Year	Title	Language	Notes
2020	Sandham: Symphony Meets Classical Tamil	Tamil	Album
2021	A Tribute to Venmurasu	Tamil	Documentary
2025	4 Seasons	Malayalam	Feature film; 7 songs. 1 song composed by Jithin Roshan
2026	Feel The Spark	English	Independent song
2026	Odyssey: A Tribute to Homer	English	Album
